= Channel 28 digital TV stations in the United States =

The following television stations broadcast on digital channel 28 in the United States:

- K28AD-D in Montrose, Colorado
- K28CQ-D in Hood River, Oregon, on virtual channel 2, which rebroadcasts KATU
- K28CS-D in Pahrump, Nevada
- K28CW-D in Flagstaff, Arizona, on virtual channel 45, which rebroadcasts KUTP
- K28CY-D in Lewiston, California
- K28DB-D in Fall River Mills, California
- K28DD-D in Bemidji, Minnesota, on virtual channel 42, which rebroadcasts KSAX
- K28DJ-D in Broken Bow, Oklahoma
- K28EA-D in Washington, Utah, on virtual channel 4, which rebroadcasts KTVX
- K28EB-D in Cortez, etc., Colorado
- K28ER-D in Dulce & Lumberton, New Mexico
- K28EU-D in Laughlin, etc., Nevada
- K28FP-D in Astoria, Oregon, on virtual channel 28
- K28FT-D in Milton-Freewater, Oregon
- K28FW-D in Peetz, Colorado, on virtual channel 20, which rebroadcasts KTVD
- K28GC-D in Gothenburg, Nebraska
- K28GD-D in Heppner, etc., Oregon
- K28GE-D in Woodland Park, Colorado
- K28GF-D in Cimarron, New Mexico
- K28GG-D in Medford, Oregon
- K28GI-D in Guymon, Oklahoma
- K28GJ-D in Hatch, New Mexico
- K28GM-D in Rural Garfield County, Utah
- K28GT-D in Crownpoint, New Mexico
- K28GV-D in Tres Piedras, New Mexico
- K28GX-D in Walker Lake, Nevada
- K28HA-D in Grand Valley, Colorado
- K28HI-D in Breckenridge/Dillon, Colorado, on virtual channel 28
- K28HL-D in Riverton, Wyoming
- K28HS-D in Agana, Guam
- K28IF-D in Willmar, Minnesota, on virtual channel 28
- K28IH-D in Rainier, Oregon, on virtual channel 10, which rebroadcasts KOPB-TV
- K28IT-D in Kanab, Utah, on virtual channel 6
- K28IX-D in Pleasant Valley, Colorado, on virtual channel 20, which rebroadcasts KTVD
- K28IZ-D in Ely, Nevada
- K28JC-D in Enterprise, Oregon
- K28JD-D in Fort Madison, Iowa
- K28JH-D in Yuma, Colorado, on virtual channel 20, which rebroadcasts K16NJ-D
- K28JK-D in Huntsville/Liberty, Utah, on virtual channel 13, which rebroadcasts KSTU
- K28JL-D in Morgan, etc., Utah, on virtual channel 13, which rebroadcasts KSTU
- K28JM-D in Waimea, Hawaii
- K28JN-D in Manti, etc., Utah, on virtual channel 2, which rebroadcasts KUTV
- K28JR-D in Wanship, Utah
- K28JS-D in Samak, Utah, on virtual channel 13, which rebroadcasts KSTU
- K28JU-D in Rock Springs, etc., Wyoming
- K28JV-D in Hilo, Hawaii
- K28JX-D in Alva - Cherokee, Oklahoma
- K28JY-D in Carbondale, Colorado
- K28KC-D in Canon City, Colorado
- K28KI-D in Roseburg, Oregon
- K28KJ-D in Chelan, Washington
- K28KM-D in Clareton, Wyoming
- K28KN-D in Emery, Utah
- K28KO-D in Sweetgrass, etc., Montana
- K28KP-D in Clear Creek, Utah
- K28KQ-D in Ferron, Utah
- K28KR-D in Huntington, Utah
- K28KU-D in Crested Butte, Colorado, on virtual channel 28
- K28KV-D in Turkey, Texas
- K28KW-D in Sunnyside, Washington
- K28LE-D in Idaho Falls, Idaho
- K28LG-D in Bridger, etc., Montana
- K28LH-D in Beowawe, Nevada
- K28LK-D in Silver City, New Mexico
- K28LL-D in Redwood Falls, Minnesota, on virtual channel 5, which rebroadcasts KSTC-TV
- K28LM-D in Eureka, Nevada
- K28LO-D in Paisley, Oregon
- K28MH-D in Bend, Oregon
- K28MJ-D in Tillamook, Oregon, on virtual channel 8, which rebroadcasts KGW
- K28MK-D in Phillips County, Montana
- K28MS-D in Bismarck, North Dakota
- K28NM-D in Carlsbad, New Mexico
- K28NN-D in Wailuku, Hawaii
- K28NO-D in Rogue River, Oregon
- K28NT-D in Bentonville & Rogers, Arkansas
- K28NU-D in Buffalo, Oklahoma
- K28NV-D in Ponca City, Oklahoma
- K28NX-D in Montoya & Newkirk, New Mexico
- K28NY-D in La Grande, Oregon
- K28NZ-D in Florence, Oregon
- K28OA-D in Cottonwood, Arizona, on virtual channel 3, which rebroadcasts KTVK
- K28OB-D in Plentywood, Montana
- K28OD-D in Powers, Oregon
- K28OE-D in Watertown, South Dakota
- K28OF-D in Memphis, Texas
- K28OG-D in Kalispell & Lakeside, Montana
- K28OH-D in St. James, Minnesota
- K28OI-D in Jackson, Minnesota
- K28OJ-D in Tropic & Cannonville, Utah
- K28OK-D in Hanksville, Utah
- K28OL-D in Loa, etc., Utah
- K28OM-D in Escalante, Utah
- K28ON-D in Castle Rock, etc., Montana
- K28OO-D in Fountain Green, Utah
- K28OP-D in Boulder, Utah
- K28OQ-D in Fishlake Resort, Utah
- K28OR-D in Caineville, Utah
- K28OS-D in Logan, Utah
- K28OT-D in Coalville, Utah
- K28OU-D in Henefer, etc., Utah
- K28OV-D in Madras, Oregon
- K28OW-D in Parowan/Enoch, etc., Utah
- K28OX-D in Weatherford, Oklahoma
- K28OY-D in Sierra Vista, Arizona
- K28PB-D in McDermitt, Nevada
- K28PC-D in Fillmore, etc., Utah
- K28PD-D in Delta, Oak City, Utah
- K28PE-D in Kanarraville, etc., Utah
- K28PF-D in Vernal, etc., Utah, on virtual channel 30, which rebroadcasts KUCW
- K28PG-D in Price, Utah
- K28PH-D in Duchesne, Utah, on virtual channel 16, which rebroadcasts KUPX-TV
- K28PI-D in Emery, Utah
- K28PJ-D in Elko, Nevada
- K28PK-D in Scofield, Utah
- K28PL-D in Roseau, Minnesota
- K28PN-D in Green River, Utah
- K28PO-D in Lake Havasu City, Arizona
- K28PP-D in Shurz, Nevada
- K28PQ-D in Saint Cloud, Minnesota, on virtual channe1 38
- K28PR-D in Castle Dale, Utah, on virtual channel 16, which rebroadcasts KUPX-TV
- K28PS-D in Ruidoso, New Mexico
- K28PT-D in Manila, etc, Utah
- K28PU-D in Randolph, Utah
- K28PV-D in Clovis, New Mexico
- K28PX-D in Stead, Nevada
- K28PZ-D in Parlin, Colorado, on virtual channel 4, which rebroadcasts K04DH-D
- K28QA-D in Sapinero, Colorado
- K28QC-D in Imlay, Nevada
- K28QE-D in Caballo, New Mexico
- K28QK-D in Pasco, Washington
- K28QL-D in Yakima, Washington
- K28QN-D in College Station, Texas
- K28QQ-D in Williston, North Dakota
- K28QR-D in La Pine, Oregon
- K28QT-D in Dickinson, North Dakota
- K44GH-D in Alexandria, Minnesota, on virtual channel 44
- KAQI-LD in Sherman, Texas
- KARZ-TV in Little Rock, Arkansas, an ATSC 3.0 station
- KATC in Lafayette, Louisiana
- KAWB in Brainerd, Minnesota, on virtual channel 22
- KAYU-TV in Spokane, Washington
- KBTC-TV (DRT) in Seattle, Washington, on virtual channel 28
- KBVU in Eureka, California
- KCET in Los Angeles, California, on virtual channel 28
- KCJO-LD in Saint Joseph, Missouri, on virtual channel 30
- KCMN-LD in Kansas City, Missouri, on virtual channel 42
- KDBK-LD in Bakersfield, California
- KEAM-LD in Amarillo, Texas
- KESQ-TV in Palm Springs, California
- KFDX-TV in Wichita Falls, Texas
- KGRY-LD in Gila River Indian Community, Arizona, an ATSC 3.0 station, on virtual channel 28
- KHNE-TV in Hastings, Nebraska
- KIRO-TV (DRT) in Mt. Vernon, Washington, on virtual channel 7
- KKPM-CD in Yuba City, California, on virtual channel 28
- KLCS in Los Angeles, California, uses KCET's spectrum, on virtual channel 58
- KLEG-CD in Dallas, Texas, on virtual channel 44
- KMMD-CD in Salinas, California
- KMPH-TV in Visalia, California
- KNLD-LD in New Orleans, Louisiana
- KOPB-TV (DRT) in Sentinel Hill, Oregon, on virtual channel 10
- KOZL-TV in Springfield, Missouri
- KPBT-TV in Odessa, Texas
- KPYX in San Francisco, California
- KSAW-LD in Twin Falls, Idaho
- KSIN-TV in Sioux City, Iowa
- KSPK-LD in Walsenburg, Colorado
- KSTU in Salt Lake City, Utah, on virtual channel 13
- KTBS-TV in Shreveport, Louisiana
- KTFD-TV in Denver, Colorado, on virtual channel 50
- KTPX-TV in Okmulgee, Oklahoma
- KTVA in Anchorage, Alaska
- KUAS-TV in Tucson, Arizona
- KUGB-CD in Houston, Texas, on virtual channel 28
- KVMM-CD in Santa Barbara, California
- KVPX-LD in Las Vegas, Nevada
- KWKD-LD in Wichita, Kansas
- KWKT-TV in Waco, Texas
- KWYB-LD in Bozeman, Montana
- KYUU-LD in Boise, Idaho
- KYVV-TV in Del Rio, Texas
- KZKC-LD in Bakersfield, California, used KDBK-LD's spectrum
- W28CJ-D in Manteo, North Carolina
- W28DA-D in Pittsfield, Massachusetts
- W28DQ-D in Windsor, Vermont
- W28DR-D in Cedarville, West Virginia
- W28DY-D in Sault Ste. Marie, Michigan
- W28EE-D in Canton, etc., North Carolina
- W28EH-D in Adjuntas, Puerto Rico, on virtual channel 2, which rebroadcasts WKAQ-TV
- W28EQ-D in Utuado, Puerto Rico, on virtual channel 2, which rebroadcasts WKAQ-TV
- W28EU-D in Macon, Georgia
- W28EW-D in Toccoa, Georgia
- W28EZ-D in Gainesville, Florida
- W28FC-D in Roanoke, West Virginia
- W28FD-D in Greenville, Florida
- W28FG-D in Cleveland-Akron-Canton, Ohio
- WBQC-LD in Cincinnati, Ohio, on virtual channel 25
- WBRE-TV in Waymart, Pennsylvania
- WBWM-LD in Mt Pleasant, Michigan
- WCAU in Philadelphia, Pennsylvania, on virtual channel 10
- WCLJ-TV in Bloomington, Indiana, uses WIPX-TV's spectrum, on virtual channel 42
- WDWW-LD in Atlanta, Georgia, on virtual channel 28
- WEDE-CD in Arlington Heights, Illinois, on virtual channel 34
- WEMT in Greeneville, Tennessee
- WEPT-CD in Peekskill, New York
- WFPT in Frederick, Maryland, on virtual channel 62
- WEVV-TV in Evansville, Indiana
- WFSG in Panama City, Florida
- WGDV-LD in Salisbury, Maryland
- WHFT-TV in Miami, Florida, on virtual channel 45
- WHMC in Conway, South Carolina
- WHPX-TV in New London, Connecticut, on virtual channel 26
- WIFR-LD in Rockford, Illinois
- WIPX-TV in Bloomington, Indiana, on virtual channel 63
- WISN-TV in Milwaukee, Wisconsin, on virtual channel 12
- WJBF in Augusta, Georgia
- WJET-TV in Erie, Pennsylvania
- WJSJ-CD in Tipton, Indiana
- WKAQ-TV in San Juan, Puerto Rico, on virtual channel 2
- WKUW-LD in White House, Tennessee, on virtual channel 40
- WLEX-TV in Lexington, Kentucky
- WLPC-LD in Redford, Michigan, on virtual channel 28
- WMAW-TV in Meridian, Mississippi
- WMCF-TV in Montgomery, Alabama
- WMYS-LD in South Bend, Indiana
- WMYV in Greensboro, North Carolina
- WNYJ-LD in Newburgh, New York
- WOAI-TV in San Antonio, Texas
- WPCB-TV in Greensburg, Pennsylvania, on virtual channel 40
- WRBU in East St. Louis, Illinois, on virtual channel 46
- WRBW in Orlando, Florida, an ATSC 3.0 station, on virtual channel 65
- WREG-TV in Memphis, Tennessee
- WRIC-TV in Petersburg, Virginia
- WSST-LD in Albany, Georgia
- WSYM-TV in Lansing, Michigan
- WSYX in Columbus, Ohio, on virtual channel 6
- WTPM-LD in Mayaguez-Anasco, Puerto Rico, on virtual channel 45
- WTVI (DRT) in Charlotte, North Carolina, on virtual channel 42
- WUDX-LD in Tuscaloosa, Alabama
- WUHF in Rochester, New York
- WUNM-TV in Jacksonville, North Carolina
- WUOA-LD in Birmingham, Alabama
- WVTB in St. Johnsbury, Vermont
- WWBH-LD in Mobile, Alabama
- WWDG-CD in Utica, New York
- WWOO-LD in Westmoreland, New Hampshire
- WWSI in Mount Laurel, New Jersey, uses WCAU's spectrum, on virtual channel 62
- WXOW in La Crosse, Wisconsin
- WYAM-LD in Priceville, Alabama
- WYMI-LD in Summerland Key, Florida
- WYOW in Eagle River, Wisconsin
- WYZZ-TV in Bloomington, Illinois
- WZVN-TV in Naples, Florida

The following television stations, which are no longer licensed, formerly broadcast on digital channel 28:

- K28LA-D in Yreka, California
- K28LC-D in Redding, California
- K28LN-D in Orr, Minnesota
- K28QJ-D in Duluth, Minnesota
- KILW-LD in Rochester, Minnesota
- KOXI-LD in Camas, Washington
- W28EX-D in Clarksburg, West Virginia
- WCMZ-TV in Flint, Michigan
- WVTX-CD in Bridgeport, Ohio
