= Channel 28 =

Channel 28 refers to several television stations:

== Canada ==
The following television stations broadcast on digital or analog channel 28 (UHF frequencies covering 555.25-559.75 MHz) in Canada:

- CICO-DT-28 in Kitchener, Ontario
- CIHF-TV-16 in Mulgrave, Nova Scotia
- CITV-DT-1 in Red Deer, Alberta
- CKTM-DT in Trois-Rivières, Quebec

The following television stations operate on virtual channel 28 in Canada:

- CICO-DT-28 in Kitchener, Ontario

== Mexico ==
The following regional network and local stations operate on virtual channel 28 in Mexico:

=== Regional network ===
- Canal 28 in the state of Nuevo León

=== Local stations ===
- XHABC-TDT in Chihuahua, Chihuahua
- XHTRES-TDT in Mexico City

== Australia ==
The Special Broadcasting Service (SBS) broadcast on UHF Channel 28 before the analogue switchover.

== See also ==
- Channel 28 TV stations in Mexico
- Channel 28 digital TV stations in the United States
- Channel 28 virtual TV stations in the United States
- Channel 28 low-power TV stations in the United States
