= ABC 28 =

ABC 28 may refer to one of the following television stations in the US affiliated with the American Broadcasting Company:

== Current ==
- KAMC in Lubbock, Texas
- KZKC-LD in Bakersfield, California
  - Local translator for KERO-TV
- WFTS-TV in Tampa–St. Petersburg, Florida

== Former ==
- WSJV in Elkhart–South Bend, Indiana (1954–1995)
- WVTX-CD (DT2) in Bridgeport, Ohio (2013–2017)
  - Simulcast of WTRF-DT3 in Wheeling, West Virginia
