= Channel 28 virtual TV stations in the United States =

The following television stations operate on virtual channel 28 in the United States:

- K05NE-D in Polson, Montana
- K08AP-D in Pateros, Mansfield, Washington
- K08CY-D in Riverside, Washington
- K09UP-D in Colville, Washington
- K09ZA-D in Leavenworth, Washington
- K10DK-D in Malott Wakefield, Washington
- K10DL-D in Tonasket, Washington
- K11UN-D in Coolin, Idaho
- K11WY-D in Coulee City, Washington
- K13ER-D in Cashmere, Washington
- K16KZ-D in Quartz Creek, etc., Montana
- K16LV-D in Grays River, Washington
- K17NZ-D in Bonners Ferry, Idaho
- K18LH-D in Lewiston, Idaho
- K18NJ-D in Bellingham, Washington
- K19AU-D in Omak, Okanogan, etc., Washington
- K20KQ-D in Livingston, etc., Montana
- K23OT-D in Juliaetta, Idaho
- K24IY-D in Raton, New Mexico
- K24LM-D in Bridgeport, Washington
- K25NY-D in Bridgeport, Washington
- K27LD-D in Salix, Iowa
- K27MT-D in Romeo, Colorado
- K27NC-D in Coeur D'Alene, Idaho
- K28DJ-D in Broken Bow, Oklahoma
- K28EB-D in Cortez, etc., Colorado
- K28FP-D in Astoria, Oregon
- K28GG-D in Medford, Oregon
- K28HI-D in Breckenridge/Dillon, Colorado
- K28HS-D in Agana, Guam
- K28IF-D in Willmar, Minnesota
- K28KO-D in Sweetgrass, etc., Montana
- K28KU-D in Crested Butte, Colorado
- K28LE-D in Idaho Falls, Idaho
- K28LK-D in Silver City, New Mexico
- K28MH-D in Bend, Oregon
- K28NM-D in Carlsbad, New Mexico
- K28OG-D in Kalispell & Lakeside, Montana
- K28OH-D in St. James, Minnesota
- K28QL-D in Yakima, Washington
- K28QT-D in Dickinson, North Dakota
- K31AH-D in Omak, etc., Washington
- K31KL-D in Walla Walla, Washington
- K32LT-D in San Luis Obispo, California
- K33LW-D in Sandpoint, Idaho
- K33QB-D in Coolin, Idaho
- K33QS-D in Santa Barbara, etc., California
- K34GI-D in Trinidad, Colorado
- K36OG-D in Bend, Oregon
- K36PZ-D in Big Spring, Texas
- KAMC in Lubbock, Texas
- KAQI-LD in Sherman, Texas
- KAYU-TV in Spokane, Washington
- KBTC-TV in Tacoma, Washington
- KBVU in Eureka, California
- KCET in Los Angeles, California
- KCNZ-CD in San Francisco, California
- KDTV-CD in Santa Rosa, California
- KEAM-LD in Amarillo, Texas
- KEPB-TV in Eugene, Oregon
- KFXA in Cedar Rapids, Iowa
- KHPK-LD in De Soto, Texas
- KHPX-CD in Georgetown, Texas
- KJST-LD in McAllen, Texas
- KKPM-CD in Chico, California
- KLPD-LD in Denver, Colorado
- KNLD-LD in New Orleans, Louisiana
- KONV-LD in Canton, Ohio
- KORO in Corpus Christi, Texas
- KSAA-LD in San Antonio, Texas
- KSBK-LD in Colorado Springs, Colorado
- KSPK-LD in Walsenburg, Colorado
- KUGB-CD in Houston, Texas
- KVES-LD in Palm Springs, California
- KVPX-LD in Las Vegas, Nevada
- KWKD-LD in Wichita, Kansas
- KWVC-LD in Malaga, etc., Washington
- KWYB-LD in Bozeman, Montana
- KYLE-TV in Bryan, Texas
- KYVV-TV in Del Rio, Texas
- KZKC-LD in Bakersfield, California
- W02CS-D in Ponce, Puerto Rico
- W19EN-D in River Falls, Wisconsin
- W23EV-D in Carrollton, Georgia
- W24CL-D in Grantsburg, Wisconsin
- W24EU-D in Erie, Pennsylvania
- W24EZ-D in Allingtown, Connecticut
- W28CJ-D in Manteo, North Carolina
- W28DY-D in Sault Ste. Marie, Michigan
- W28FC-D in Roanoke, West Virginia
- W28FD-D in Greenville, Florida
- W28FG-D in Cleveland-Akron-Canton, Ohio
- W29EZ-D in Elmira, New York
- WBRE-TV in Wilkes-Barre, Pennsylvania
- WBUN-LD in Birmingham, Alabama
- WBWM-LD in Mt Pleasant, Michigan
- WCPB in Salisbury, Maryland
- WDWW-LD in Atlanta, Georgia
- WDYL-LD in Louisville, Kentucky
- WEZK-LD in Knoxville, Tennessee
- WFEF-LD in Orlando, Florida
- WFPA-CD in Philadelphia, Pennsylvania
- WFTS-TV in Tampa, Florida
- WFXQ-CD in Springfield, Massachusetts
- WGAT-LD in Augusta, Georgia
- WGFL in High Springs, Florida
- WGTB-CD in Charlotte, North Carolina
- WHWC-TV in Menomonie, Wisconsin
- WJSP-TV in Columbus, Georgia
- WLPC-CD in Redford, Michigan
- WLWC in New Bedford, Massachusetts
- WNPX-TV in Franklin, Tennessee
- WNYF-CD in Watertown, New York
- WNYP-LD in Port Jervis, New York
- WPGX in Panama City, Florida
- WRDC in Durham, North Carolina
- WRJT-LD in Wausau, Wisconsin
- WSJV in Elkhart, Indiana
- WTGS in Hardeeville, South Carolina
- WTTE in Columbus, Ohio
- WUDX-LD in Tuscaloosa, Alabama
- WUDZ-LD in Terre Haute, Indiana
- WVER in Rutland, Vermont
- WWBH-LD in Mobile, Alabama
- WWBK-LD in Richmond, Virginia
- WWNY-CD in Massena, New York
- WWYA-LD in Honea Path, South Carolina
- WYMI-LD in Summerland Key, Florida

The following stations, which are no longer licensed, formerly operated on virtual channel 28 in the United States:

- K28LA-D in Yreka, California
- K28LC-D in Redding, California
- K28QJ-D in Duluth, Minnesota
- K32NP-D in Billings, Montana
- W28EX-D in Clarksburg, West Virginia
- WAZF-CD in Front Royal, Virginia
- WCMZ-TV in Flint, Michigan
- WQVC-CD in Greensburg, Pennsylvania
- WVTX-CD in Bridgeport, Ohio
