= KYUU-LD =

Television station in Boise, Idaho

- Boise, Idaho; United States
- Channels: Digital: 28 (UHF); Virtual: 35
- Branding: Treasure Valley CW; CBS 2 News on The CW

Programming
- Affiliations: 35.1: CW+; for others, see § Subchannels

Ownership
- Owner: Sinclair Broadcast Group; (Sinclair Boise Licensee, LLC)
- Sister stations: KBOI-TV

History
- First air date: November 10, 1993 (original station); October 1, 2012 (current station)
- Last air date: September 10, 2012 (original station)
- Former call signs: K66EV (1993–2000); K35GE (2000–2004); KUNS-LP (2004–2006); KUNB-LP (2006–2009); KYUU-LP (2009–2012)
- Former channel numbers: Analog: 66 (UHF, 1993–2000), 35 (UHF, 2000–2012)
- Former affiliations: Telefutura (2002–2008); CBS (as KBOI repeater, 2008–2009); RTV (2009–2011)

Technical information
- Licensing authority: FCC
- Facility ID: 190303
- Class: LD
- ERP: 8.8 kW
- HAAT: 852 m (2,795 ft)
- Transmitter coordinates: 43°45′20.8″N 116°5′57″W
- Translator(s): KBOI-TV 2.2

Links
- Public license information: LMS
- Website: cwtreasurevalley.com

KYUU-LD (channel 35) is a low-power television station in Boise, Idaho, United States, affiliated with The CW Plus. It is owned by Sinclair Broadcast Group alongside CBS affiliate KBOI-TV (channel 2). The two stations share studios on North 16th Street in downtown Boise; KYUU-LD's transmitter is located at the Bogus Basin ski area summit in unincorporated Boise County.

In addition to its own digital signal, KYUU-LD is simulcast in 720p high definition on KBOI-TV's second digital subchannel from the same transmitter site.

== History ==
The station signed on November 10, 1993, with the call sign K66EV and airing an analog signal on UHF channel 66. Until mid-December 2008, it was affiliated with the Spanish-language network Telefutura as K35GE, later KUNB-LP and broadcasting on channel 35. The station then began to simulcast sister station KBCI-TV (now KBOI-TV) until July 1, 2009, when it joined the Retro Television Network; the KYUU-LP call letters were assigned on June 10. At one point in time, the station was listed as a Univision affiliate but has never been affiliated with that network.

On September 12, 2011, KYUU-LP became Boise's CW affiliate, with RTV programming moving to a subchannel on ABC affiliate KIVI-TV (channel 6). At some point in 2012, KYUU-LP shut down its analog signal and started broadcasting in digital on channel 28, using virtual channel 35. On April 11, 2013, Fisher Communications announced that it would sell its properties, including KYUU-LD, to the Sinclair Broadcast Group. The deal was completed on August 8, 2013.

== Technical information ==
=== Subchannels ===
The station's signal is multiplexed:

Subchannels of KYUU-LD
Channel	Res.	Short name	Programming
35.1	720p	CW35	The CW Plus
35.2	480i	ROAR	Roar
35.3	480i	Comet	Comet
35.4	480i	TheNest	The Nest
35.5	480i	Dabl	Dabl

== See also ==
- Channel 2 branded TV stations in the United States
- Channel 28 digital TV stations in the United States
- Channel 28 low-power TV stations in the United States
- Channel 35 virtual TV stations in the United States
