= KCOS =

KCOS may refer to:

- KCOS (TV), a television station (channel 13, virtual channel 13) licensed to El Paso, Texas, United States
- KCOS-LP, a defunct low-power television station (channel 28) formerly licensed to Phoenix, Arizona, United States
- the ICAO airport code for Colorado Springs Airport in Colorado Springs, Colorado, United States
- "Kirksville College of Osteopathy and Surgery," the name under which A.T. Still University operated from 1926 to 1971.
