= Your ABC =

Your ABC is a tagline used by

- ABC TV (Australian TV channel)
- WBOY-TV
