= WVTX =

WVTX may refer to:

- WVTX (FM), a radio station (88.7 FM) licensed to serve Colchester, Vermont, United States
- WVTX-CD, a defunct low-power television station (channel 28) formerly licensed to serve Bridgeport, Ohio, United States
