= WTRF-TV =

Television station in Wheeling, West Virginia

- Wheeling, West Virginia; Steubenville, Ohio; United States
- City: Wheeling, West Virginia
- Channels: Digital: 7 (VHF); Virtual: 7
- Branding: WTRF 7 News

Programming
- Affiliations: 7.1: CBS; 7.2: Independent with MyNetworkTV; 7.3: ABC; 7.4: Ion Mystery

Ownership
- Owner: Nexstar Media Group; (Nexstar Media Inc.)

History
- First air date: October 24, 1953
- Former channel numbers: Analog: 7 (VHF, 1953–2009); Digital: 32 (UHF, 2001–2009)
- Former affiliations: NBC (1953–1980); ABC (secondary; 1953–1980s); Fox (7.2; 2007–2014)
- Call sign meaning: Assigned randomly to the formerly co-owned radio stations in 1947

Technical information
- Licensing authority: FCC
- Facility ID: 6869
- ERP: 25.4 kW
- HAAT: 293 m (961 ft)
- Transmitter coordinates: 40°3′41.3″N 80°45′7.3″W

Links
- Public license information: Public file; LMS
- Website: www.wtrf.com

WTRF-TV (channel 7) is a television station licensed to Wheeling, West Virginia, United States, serving the Wheeling, West Virginia–Steubenville, Ohio market as an affiliate of CBS, MyNetworkTV, and ABC. The station is owned by Nexstar Media Group and maintains studios on 16th Street in downtown Wheeling; its transmitter is located in Bridgeport, Ohio.

WTRF-TV was the first station to specifically serve Wheeling and Steubenville, beginning broadcasting in 1953. It was originally an NBC affiliate before switching to CBS in January 1980. In the 2000s, it expanded to add two new subchannel services.

== History ==
Tri-City Broadcasting Corporation, owner of radio stations WTRF (1290 AM) and WTRF-FM 100.5 across the Ohio River in Bellaire, Ohio, applied to the Federal Communications Commission (FCC) on April 13, 1948, for a construction permit to build a television station on channel 12, then assigned to Wheeling. Another application was made by the Fort Industry Company—owner of WWVA—but before a hearing could be held, the FCC declared a freeze on TV construction permits that was to last four years. The WTRF stations moved to Wheeling proper in 1950, and the application was amended to follow suit; it also was changed to specify channel 7 after the FCC lifted the freeze. WWVA instead opted to pursue channel 9 in Steubenville, Ohio, but two other groups—one consisting of radio station WKWK (1400 AM) and the News Publishing Company and the other being Polan Industries of Huntington, West Virginia—also sought channel 7 after the freeze. Polan opted to abandon the hearing and won a permit for UHF channel 51; to expedite the construction of a station in Wheeling, Tri-City and WKWK merged their applications, with the two groups combining.

The construction permit was granted on April 22, 1953, and broadcasting began six months later, on October 24. The station made its start date despite fears that it would not be able to begin airing programming because of several parts that failed at the last minute. The primary affiliation was NBC; some CBS programming was aired until WSTV-TV (channel 9, now WTOV-TV) started, and from the start the station also was a secondary outlet of ABC.

The radio stations were sold off in 1954 to John Kluge, with Tri-City retaining WTRF-TV and the call sign. The Dix family, stockholders in Tri-City and publishers of several Ohio newspapers and owners of radio stations in Ohio and Virginia, acquired majority control in 1959. WTRF-TV was sold along with the second WTRF-FM (107.5) in 1969 to Forward Communications of Wausau, Wisconsin, for $7 million. During the 1970s, two reporters with futures in network news started their careers at WTRF-TV: Faith Daniels, later an anchor for NBC and CBS, and Bob Orr, later of CBS News. Also in this decade, the station was carried on the cable system in Canton, Ohio, because it aired Cleveland Browns games that Cleveland-area stations had to black out under National Football League blackout rules of the time.

In 1979, citing the erosion of NBC's ratings in the preceding years, WTRF-TV announced it would switch to CBS on April 1, 1980. It ruled out ABC, then the leading network, because 56 percent of its market was served by cable systems that put Pittsburgh's ABC affiliate, WTAE-TV, next to WTRF-TV on subscribers' dials. General manager Charles E. Sherman, citing the loyalty of many viewers to NBC, called the change the hardest decision he had ever had to make. The change was brought forward to January 7, 1980; WTOV-TV switched from CBS to NBC, deciding against a bid from ABC. At that time, WTRF-TV was the leading station in the market. A three-story addition was built to the studio facility in 1980.

Forward was sold in late 1984 to Wesray Capital Corporation, which retained the Forward name for its media holdings. Wesray sold the Forward stations to Adams Communications in 1988, but the deal left Adams highly leveraged and ill-prepared to confront declines in the value of broadcast properties, prompting it to default on $283 million of debt in 1991. Brissette Broadcasting was formed the next year when Paul Brissette, who had been the vice president of Adams Communications's television stations division, bought out the business for $257 million. Four years later, in a $270 million merger, Brissette was folded into Benedek Broadcasting after the company was unable to expand by adding stations.

Before Benedek declared bankruptcy in 2002, a weak advertising market in the early 2000s recession had already led the company to sell WTRF-TV to West Virginia Media Holdings (WVMH). WVMH was a new group led by Bray Cary that was buying media properties, primarily in television, in major West Virginia markets. In May of that year, WVMH closed on the $18.5 million purchase of the Wheeling station and the $40.5 million acquisition of WOWK-TV in Charleston.

In 2007, WTRF launched its second digital subchannel, "Fox Ohio Valley", as a Fox and secondary MyNetworkTV affiliate. WVMH added Fox subchannels to WTRF-TV and WVNS-TV in the Bluefield/Beckley market; Cary had known the executives from his prior sports media work with NASCAR and Creative Sports. The next year, the region's first full-time ABC affiliate, "ABC Ohio Valley", launched as an additional subchannel. On September 1, 2014, WTRF lost the Fox affiliation on 7.2 to WTOV. The subchannel's secondary affiliation with MyNetworkTV then became its primary, rebranding as "My Ohio Valley". These subchannels were originally broadcast in standard definition from the WTRF-TV transmitter and in high definition to the immediate Wheeling area on WVTX-CD (channel 28), which WTRF leased for this purpose until its spectrum was sold in 2017.

On November 17, 2015, Nexstar Broadcasting Group announced that it would purchase the West Virginia Media Holdings stations, including WTRF-TV, for $130 million. Under the terms of the deal, Nexstar assumed control of the stations through a time brokerage agreement in December 2015, with the sale of the license assets completed on January 31, 2017.

== News operation ==
WTRF-TV produces morning, noon, early evening and late newscasts from its Wheeling studio. The My Ohio Valley subchannel airs a dedicated 10 p.m. newscast. The ABC subchannel simulcasts the weekday editions of 7News at 6 a.m., noon, 6 and 11 p.m. The news staff has been unionized since 1988, when workers voted to join the American Federation of Television and Radio Artists.

== Technical information and subchannels ==
WTRF-TV's transmitter is located in Bridgeport, Ohio. The station's signal is multiplexed:

Subchannels of WTRF-TV
Subchannel	Res.	Short name	Programming
7.1	1080i	WTRFCBS	CBS
7.2	720p	WTRFMY	Independent with MyNetworkTV
7.3	720p	WTRFABC	ABC
7.4	480i	Escape	Ion Mystery

== See also ==
- Channel 7 digital TV stations in the United States
- Channel 7 virtual TV stations in the United States
