= KZKC =

KZKC may refer to:

- KSMO-TV, a television station in Kansas City, Missouri called as KZKC from 1985 until 1991
- KZKC (FM), a defunct radio station (89.9 FM) formerly licensed to serve Kettleman City, California
- KZKC-LD, a low-power television station (channel 28) licensed to serve Bakersfield, California
