= 12 News (disambiguation) =

12 News may refer to the following:

- KPNX, a television station in Mesa, Arizona
- KWCH-DT, a television station in Wichita, Kansas
- WBOY-TV, a television station in Clarksburg, West Virginia
