= Lloyd Lindsay Young =

American weather presenter

Lloyd Lindsay Young, known as "Double L" (born September 4, 1941) is an American weather reporter who gained notoriety for his over-the-top delivery and antics. He is the father of former KGET-TV weatherman George Lindsay Young, with whom he worked for several years in New York.

Young grew up in Hollywood, California. He attended Los Angeles City College and has been in the broadcasting business since 1962, when he started at Bakersfield, California radio station KWAK AM 970. He spent three years at WFIE, channel 14 in Evansville, Indiana, leaving in late 1980, then was at KGO-TV in San Francisco from 1981 to 1983. He also spent twelve years at WWOR-TV, channel 9 in Secaucus, New Jersey, through October 1, 1995. In his ascendancy, he was seen on KIFI-TV, Idaho Falls, and heard on KNAK, Salt Lake City; his break came when the San Francisco station's news manager heard him when on a skiing vacation in Sun Valley in the 1970s.

Starting in 1996, while living and working in Bakersfield, Young was also a weatherman on KGO 810 radio out of San Francisco on the afternoon drive-time newscast; he added the morning drive-time slot in 2009, replacing the retired Leo Ciolino. On December 1, 2011, KGO fired Young as well as many talk-show hosts.

Young was the television weatherman at KERO in Bakersfield, California until September 2008. He was replaced by former KERO weatherman Rusty Shoop.

Between 2012 and 2016, Young was heard on KKSF-AM in San Francisco. He was let go in July 2016 after KKSF-AM became an ESPN Deportes station.

His trademark intro is "Hellooooo (insert city name)", which he started doing in Idaho. He is also known for his outrageous weather pointers, including icicles, mannequin legs, and a six-foot model of the Empire State Building with attached King Kong. His wild weather routine has earned him guest spots on Geraldo and The Howard Stern Show.

Young had cameo appearances in the films Working Girl and Age Isn't Everything. Young also introduced George Carlin in his stand-up special What Am I Doing In New Jersey?

It is Young who says "it's a trip, it's got a funky beat, and I can bug out to it" in the Beastie Boys song "B-Boy Bouillabaisse" (in the "Mike on the Mic" segment) from the 1989 album Paul's Boutique. According to author Dan LeRoy in his book on Paul's Boutique, the group commissioned Young to appear on the album when they became a fan of his work on WWOR. The introduction to their song "Hello Brooklyn" may have also been influenced by Young's trademark calls. Also, Young's voice saying "bug out to it" can be heard in a sample (at 1:11) in the Beastie Boys song "Three MC's And One DJ" on their 1998 album Hello Nasty. The line can also be heard in the introduction to the video remix version of Do Me! by Bell Biv DeVoe.
