= The State Journal (West Virginia) =

- Type: Business newspaper
- Owner: WV News
- Founder(s): Robert C. Payne, Henry E. Payne III and Fred F. Holroyd
- Publisher: Andrew Kniceley
- Founded: October 1984
- Language: English
- Headquarters: Clarksburg, West Virginia
- City: Clarksburg, West Virginia
- Country: United States
- ISSN: 1521-8767
- Website: www.wvnews.com/statejournal

The State Journal is an American newspaper and digital news publication covering business, government, energy, law and economic development in West Virginia. Founded in 1984 as a statewide business newspaper, it is published by WV News, formerly known as NCWV Media.

The publication was established to serve a statewide readership interested in commerce and public policy. Its principal subjects have included West Virginia businesses and industries, state government, legislation, energy, health care, education and the legal profession.

== History ==
=== Founding and early years ===
Brothers Robert C. Payne and Henry E. Payne III and Charleston lawyer Fred F. Holroyd founded The State Journal in October 1984. The founders believed West Virginia needed a publication devoted to statewide business activity rather than to a single city or county. The newspaper began as a weekly serving business owners, executives, professionals and government officials throughout the state.

The publication experienced financial difficulties during its early years. Lorenelle White, who became involved in its advertising and sales operations, helped develop its commercial base. White and her husband purchased the newspaper in 1997, after which its weekly publication schedule was re-established and the business became profitable.

=== West Virginia Media Holdings ===
In November 2001, the White family sold The State Journal to the newly created West Virginia Media Holdings. The company operated television stations in West Virginia's major media markets, including WOWK-TV, WBOY-TV, WVNS-TV and WTRF-TV. Under West Virginia Media Holdings, the newspaper gained access to a larger statewide news organization and increased its editorial resources.

A 2005 West Virginia University study reported that the newspaper then employed approximately 20 people, including nine news employees. The study also said that the publication had received national recognition for its reporting, although its publicly available abstract did not identify the individual awards.

=== WV News ownership ===
NCWV Media acquired the newspaper in December 2016. The company had printed The State Journal since 2003 and already published several newspapers in north-central West Virginia, including The Exponent Telegram, the Fairmont News, the Weston News, the Bridgeport News and the Preston News & Journal.

At the time of the acquisition, NCWV Media said it intended to expand the newspaper's distribution while retaining its emphasis on West Virginia's business, legal and political communities. West Virginia Media Holdings founder Bray Cary retained a minority interest following the transaction, while NCWV Media owner Brian Jarvis became the principal owner.

NCWV Media subsequently adopted the WV News name for its print and digital network. By 2022, WV News identified The State Journal as its statewide business publication within a portfolio of local newspapers, magazines, websites and electronic editions.

== Coverage and purpose ==
The State Journal was conceived as a trade-oriented newspaper with statewide rather than local geographic coverage. Its original purpose was to report on the conditions affecting West Virginia businesses and to highlight economic problems, potential solutions and business accomplishments within the state.

The publication has described its principal editorial areas as business, government and law. Employment materials issued during its West Virginia Media Holdings period also identified energy as one of its principal beats. In addition to its print publication, it publishes breaking news and longer-form reporting through the WV News website, email newsletters, social media and electronic editions.

== Readership ==
The newspaper is directed principally toward West Virginia business owners, executives, managers, attorneys, public officials and other professionals. Its geographic market is statewide rather than limited to the city in which its business operations are based.

In advertising materials, the publication describes its readers as comparatively affluent and highly educated. It claims that 85 percent of its audience consists of college graduates, 62 percent holds top-management positions and readers have an average net worth of $2.2 million. The same materials claim average gross business sales of $228 million among the readership. These figures are marketing claims published by the newspaper itself; the underlying survey date, sample, methodology and independent audit status are not stated on the advertising page.

== Recognition and public programs ==
The 2005 West Virginia University study of the newspaper's development reported that The State Journal had received national recognition for its news coverage after its acquisition by West Virginia Media Holdings. The study's online abstract does not enumerate the awards, and independently published records sufficient to compile a complete list have not been identified.

The newspaper also sponsors programs recognizing West Virginia business and civic leaders. Its annual Who's Who in West Virginia Business program has honored executives, entrepreneurs, educators, health-care administrators and community leaders. In 2005, the newspaper established the Lorenelle White Lifetime Achievement Award in memory of its former owner and publisher. The award recognizes people credited with long-term contributions to business and community life in West Virginia.

Another program, Generation Next: 40 Under 40, recognizes younger professionals working in fields including business, health care, technology, education, energy and law. The program reached its 20th annual class in 2025.

In 2026, The State Journal and WV News introduced the West Virginia Business Leadership Awards, recognizing chief executives, financial officers, operations officers, marketing and technology officers, entrepreneurs and other business leaders. Honorees were divided according to the size of their organizations.

== Ownership and related publications ==
The State Journal is part of WV News, a privately held West Virginia media group led by president and owner Brian Jarvis. The group publishes local newspapers, magazines, websites, newsletters and electronic editions in West Virginia and neighboring communities in Maryland and Ohio.

WV News publications have included The Exponent Telegram, the Bridgeport News, the Fairmont News, the Weston Democrat, the Preston County News & Journal, the Mineral News & Tribune, the Jackson Star & Herald, the River Cities Tribune & Register, the Record Delta, the Mountain Statesman, Blue & Gold News and NCWV Life.

== See also ==
List of newspapers in West Virginia

West Virginia Media Holdings
