= Ghent, West Virginia =

- Census-designated place
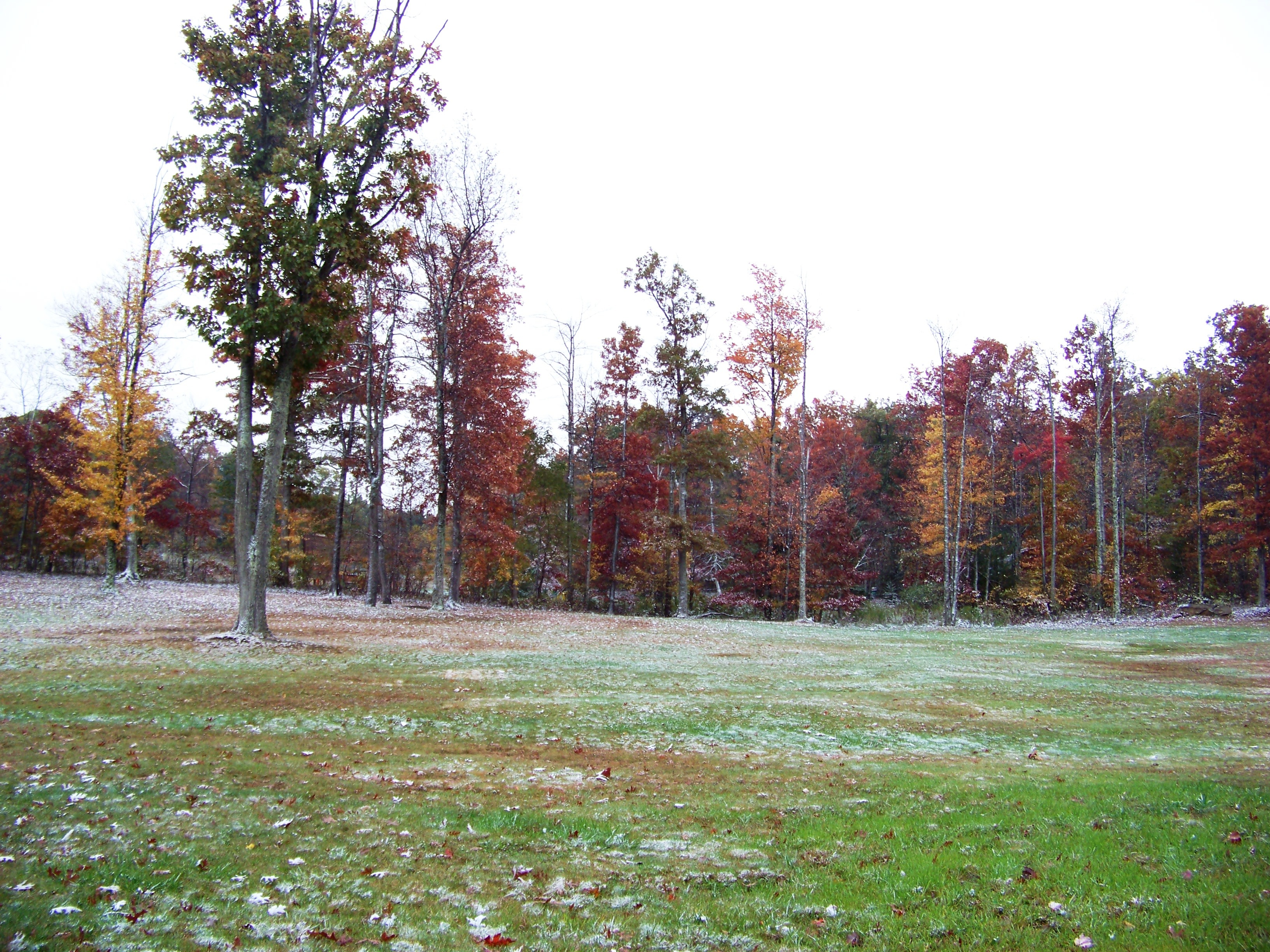
- A dusting of snow in Ghent

- Location within the state of West Virginia
- Coordinates: 37°37′31″N 81°06′22″W
- Country: United States
- State: West Virginia
- County: Raleigh
- Named for: Treaty of Ghent

Area
  - Total: 1.612 sq mi (4.18 km^{2})
  - Land: 1.281 sq mi (3.32 km^{2})
  - Water: 0.331 sq mi (0.86 km^{2})
- Elevation: 2,897 ft (883 m)

Population (2020)
  - Total: 582
  - Density: 454/sq mi (175/km^{2})
- Time zone: UTC-5 (Eastern (EST))
  - Summer (DST): UTC-4 (EDT)
- GNIS feature ID: 2586809

Ghent /ˈdʒɛnt/ is a census-designated place in Raleigh County, West Virginia, United States. As of the 2020 census, its population was 582 (up from 457 at the 2010 census).

== History ==
The community's name commemorates the Treaty of Ghent, which ended the War of 1812.

In 1949, plans were made to create an artificial lake near the town of Beckley, West Virginia. Construction of an earthen dam across Glade Creek, with a concrete sluice and spillway, began in Ghent in the summer of 1950; the new lake was filled in April 1951. Members of the newly formed Flat Top Lake Association had also planned construction of a large housing community around the lake, but after 180 lots had been sold to members, an assessment showed the project was still indebted by nearly $190,000 (nearly $2,000,000 in 2021). At a meeting called in March 1961, 144 of the 180 members agreed to each purchase a second lot, saving the project. The new Flat Top Lake community was formed, and has seen steady growth over the years. The dam was upgraded to match current safety standards in 2017.

In 1958, the Bald Knob Ski Resort was opened on the epynonymous mountain, near Ghent. The resort was not a financial success, closing in 1961. A new resort opened on nearby Huff Knob fifteen years later, was much more successful, and is still in business. The second theme park now operates as Winterplace Ski Resort, which is considered on Tripadvisor to be Ghent's main attraction. The site of the old park is still visible on the opposite slopes, and is referred to by locals as "Old Winterplace".

=== 2007 Propane Disaster ===
On January 30, 2007, the Little General convenience store on 2964 Flat Top Road was destroyed when a 500-gallon (1,892-liter) propane tank began to leak during maintenance. A high-pressure jet of propane burst upwards from the canister and vaporized upon contact with air, entering the store and finding an ignition source; the subsequent explosion destroyed the tank and leveled the store. Two propane technicians and two first responders were killed, and six other people were injured in the incident.

The Chemical Safety Board investigated the incident, and found that the store and the area around it had not been evacuated, even with first responders present, during the thirty minutes between the start of the massive leak and the explosion. Employees were still within the closed store, and EMTs were treating a propane technician for chemically induced frostbite just feet away from the leaky tank, when the explosion occurred. Further investigation revealed that neither the local 9-1-1 operators nor the local first responders were trained on what to do in case of propane leaks. Local EMTs and police officers were given no HAZMAT training at all, and the last time local firefighters had received HAZMAT training was 9 years prior, though this training had not mentioned propane. The newly hired, inexperienced propane technician performing the maintenance (transferring contents from an old tank into a new) also had no formal safety training. His superior, against industry policy, had left his subordinate to work alone, only returning shortly before the explosion, in which both technicians were killed.

Another finding showed the propane tank had been built flush with the back wall of the building, in a direct violation of OSHA's requirement that industrial propane tanks be built at least 10 feet (3.0 meters) away from other structures. The closeness of the tank allowed the vapors from the high-pressure release of propane to strike the eaves and enter the building through vents near the roof. While the exact ignition source was never determined, it was noted practically all the potential ignition sources encompassed by the vapor cloud were inside the building (such as the pizza ovens, electrical equipment, and heating elements). This meant the nearness of the tank to the building was almost certainly responsible for the leak escalating into an explosion. Finally, the transfer valve that failed, releasing the vapors, was recovered after the explosion, and revealed a manufacturing fault freezing it in the "open" position. Such valves have a cap with a side hole, which will release a small jet of propane when twisted, if the valve is stuck open. This jet is a warning to a technician not to remove the cap; however, the untrained junior technician had removed the cap of the faulty valve, allowing the release, and had almost certainly not known to twist-check it first, having neither seen nor attempted a transfer before. The CSB released all their findings in a public meeting in Ghent in 2008, describing what had happened as a completely preventable tragedy, and stressing the importance of properly mandated training for first responders and hazardous chemical personnel.

== Climate ==
The climate in this area has mild differences between highs and lows, and there is adequate rainfall year-round. According to the Köppen Climate Classification system, Ghent has a marine west coast climate, abbreviated "Cfb" on climate maps.

== Media ==
Ghent is home to the studios of WVNS-TV.
