= KERO-TV =

Television station in Bakersfield, California

- Bakersfield, California; United States
- Channels: Digital: 10 (VHF); Virtual: 23
- Branding: 23 ABC

Programming
- Affiliations: 23.1: ABC; for others, see § Subchannels

Ownership
- Owner: E. W. Scripps Company; (Scripps Broadcasting Holdings LLC)

History
- First air date: September 26, 1953
- Former channel numbers: Analog: 10 (VHF, 1953–1963), 23 (UHF, 1963–2009)
- Former affiliations: NBC (1953–1984); CBS (1984–1996)
- Call sign meaning: Kern County Outlet

Technical information
- Licensing authority: FCC
- Facility ID: 40878
- ERP: 10.8 kW
- HAAT: 1,107 m (3,632 ft)
- Transmitter coordinates: 35°27′13.8″N 118°35′40.3″W
- Translator(s): KZKC-LD 28 (UHF) Bakersfield (city)

Links
- Public license information: Public file; LMS
- Website: www.turnto23.com

KERO-TV (channel 23) is a television station in Bakersfield, California, United States, affiliated with ABC and owned by the E. W. Scripps Company. The station's studios are located on 21st Street in Downtown Bakersfield, and its transmitter is located atop Breckenridge Mountain.

KERO-TV operates digital translator KZKC-LD (channel 28), which allows homes with issues receiving KERO-TV's VHF signal or only a UHF antenna to receive KERO-TV in some form.

== History ==
KERO-TV went on the air on September 26, 1953, on channel 10 as an NBC affiliate. During the late 1950s, the station was also briefly affiliated with the NTA Film Network. It was locally owned by Kern County Broadcasters along with KERO radio (1230 AM, now KGEO). The two stations shared a studio in the lobby of the El Tejon Hotel, which was located at the corner of Truxtun Avenue and Chester Avenue. KERO-TV later moved to its current studios on 21st Street.

The radio and TV stations were broken up in late 1955, when KERO radio was sold. Wrather-Alvarez Broadcasting, parent of KFMB-AM-TV in San Diego, purchased KERO-TV in early 1957; when the Wrather–Alvarez partnership broke up a year later, Jack Wrather kept KERO-TV and the San Diego stations as part of his newly renamed Marietta Broadcasting. In 1959, Wrather merged Marietta Broadcasting into Buffalo, New York-based Transcontinent Television Corporation.

One of KERO-TV's best remembered shows was Cousin Herb's Trading Post, a local variety series in the 1950s. The show's host Herb Henson was a country musician, and often featured local artists such as Buck Owens and Tommy Collins, who would come to popularize the "Bakersfield Sound". Another local favorite was The Uncle Woody Show in the 1960s and 1970s. Radio and TV personality Casey Kasem also used the KERO studios to tape a weekly musical TV variety show entitled SheBang in the mid-to-late 1960s, while a disc jockey at KRLA in Los Angeles.

As a result of the Federal Communications Commission (FCC) making both the Bakersfield and Fresno television markets all-UHF through what was termed as deintermixture, KERO-TV moved to channel 23 on July 1, 1963, and simulcasted on channels 10 and 23 for two months, with channel 10 being shut off at the end of August of the same year. The move of KERO-TV to channel 23 opened up channel 10 for use by KLVX in Las Vegas, which signed on the air in 1968.

Transcontinent sold most of its stations to Taft Broadcasting in 1964, but KERO was not included; it was sold to Time-Life. Another publishing firm, McGraw-Hill, acquired KERO-TV in 1972 along with the rest of Time-Life's broadcasting division—KOGO-TV (now KGTV) in San Diego, KLZ-TV (now KMGH-TV) in Denver (its sole CBS affiliate at the time) and WFBM-TV (now WRTV) in Indianapolis.

As its sister stations KGTV and WRTV switched to ABC in the late 1970s, it was expected that KERO-TV would eventually switch to from third-place NBC to first-place ABC. But instead, in March 1984, KERO-TV swapped affiliations with KGET-TV and joined CBS, citing the network's stronger programming in the Bakersfield area. On March 1, 1996, as part of a corporate affiliation deal between McGraw-Hill and ABC spurred by a deal between Group W and CBS, KERO picked up the ABC affiliation from cross-town rival KBAK-TV (channel 29), and in the process became the second television station in the Bakersfield market (after KGET), and one of a handful of television stations in the United States, to have been an affiliate of all of the traditional Big Three television networks (NBC, CBS, and ABC).

In August 2006, KERO-TV gained a sister station, KZKC-LP, then an Azteca América affiliate.

On October 3, 2011, McGraw-Hill announced it was selling its entire television station group to the E. W. Scripps Company for $212 million. The deal was completed on December 30, 2011.

== Programming ==
In 2004, KERO-TV, along with the other McGraw-Hill stations, claimed that they tried to preempt Saving Private Ryan, but out of desperation, aired the film.

On September 8, 2014, the station dropped the Sony game shows Jeopardy! and Wheel of Fortune due to Scripps' chain-wide effort to replace the shows in their markets with lower-cost local and chain-produced programming. The programs moved to KBAK, and were replaced with two Scripps-produced programs, newsmagazine The List and game show Let's Ask America (the latter being replaced with Inside Edition after its cancellation).

=== News operation ===
Former news anchor Burleigh Smith (died 1990) is considered by many to be the father of television news in Bakersfield. Smith produced and anchored at KERO from 1954 to 1960, and again from 1973 to 1990.

Other longtime KERO news personalities include Don Rodewald (who hosted the afternoon movie), George Day, and Sunny Scofield. MSNBC Live & Direct host Rita Cosby was a KERO reporter in the 1980s.

Lloyd Lindsay Young joined the station in 2005 as chief weathercaster. His trademark intro is "Hellooooo (insert city name)". He is also known for his outrageous weather pointers which are sent in by viewers; submissions have ranged from a mannequin leg to a dildo. On September 17, 2008, The Bakersfield Californian reported that Young departed KERO-TV after more than three years there. No reason was given, which followed the broadcasts of September 16, 2008. Rusty Shoop, who is known throughout Bakersfield, and was a former KERO weather anchor, replaced Young. Shoop earlier suffered a brain aneurysm and this was his first TV appearance since the illness. Shoop started on October 27, 2008. After being at KERO-TV for a year, Shoop retired from broadcasting on December 9, 2009, for medical reasons stemming from the brain aneurysm. On January 18, 2010, Jack Church, who was chief meteorologist from 1999 to 2001, replaced Rusty Shoop and was the chief meteorologist from January 18, 2010, until May 5, 2011.

==== Notable former staff ====
- Rita Cosby
- Frank Gifford
- Lynn Noel – public affairs director
- Rusty Shoop – chief meteorologist (1984; 2008–2009)
- Lloyd Lindsay Young – chief meteorologist (2005–2008)

== Technical information ==
=== Subchannels ===
The station's signal is multiplexed:

Subchannels of KERO-TV
Subchannel	Res.	Short name	Programming
23.1	720p	KERO-HD	ABC
23.2	720p	COURT	Court TV
23.3	480i	GRIT	Grit
23.4	480i	Grit-TV	Ion
23.5	480i	Bounce	Bounce TV
23.6	480i	BUSTED	Busted
23.7	480i	Oxygen	Oxygen
23.8	480i	HSN	HSN

=== Analog-to-digital conversion ===
KERO-TV discontinued regular programming on its analog signal, over UHF channel 23, on June 12, 2009, the official date on which full-power television stations in the United States transitioned from analog to digital broadcasts under federal mandate. The station's digital signal remained on its pre-transition VHF channel 10, using virtual channel 23.

== See also ==
- KZKC-LD
