= WBOY-TV =

Television station in Clarksburg, West Virginia

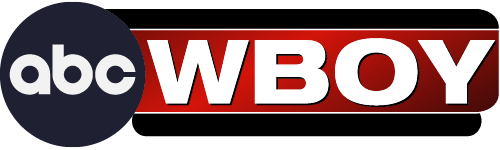
- Clarksburg–Fairmont–; Morgantown, West Virginia; United States
- City: Clarksburg, West Virginia
- Channels: Digital: 12 (VHF); Virtual: 12
- Branding: WBOY NBC 12; WBOY Your ABC (12.2); 12 News (newscasts)

Programming
- Affiliations: 12.1: NBC; 12.2: ABC; for others, see § Subchannels

Ownership
- Owner: Nexstar Media Group; (Nexstar Media Inc.)
- Sister stations: WOWK-TV, WTRF-TV, WVNS-TV

History
- First air date: November 17, 1957
- Former call signs: WBLK-TV (CP, 1954–1957)
- Former channel numbers: Analog: 12 (VHF, 1957–2009); Digital: 52 (UHF, 2002–2009)
- Former affiliations: ABC (secondary, 1957–1976)

Technical information
- Licensing authority: FCC
- Facility ID: 71220
- ERP: 12.25 kW
- HAAT: 262 m (860 ft)
- Transmitter coordinates: 39°17′5.7″N 80°19′44.8″W

Links
- Public license information: Public file; LMS
- Website: www.wboy.com

WBOY-TV (channel 12) is a television station licensed to Clarksburg, West Virginia, United States, serving North Central West Virginia as an affiliate of NBC and ABC. Owned by Nexstar Media Group, the station maintains studios on West Pike Street in downtown Clarksburg, and its transmitter is located east of downtown and US 50.

The station identifies on-air as "Clarksburg–Fairmont–Morgantown" even though the latter city is considered to be part of the Pittsburgh market. Despite this, WBOY-TV operates a news bureau in Morgantown which makes it the only commercial station to have facilities there.

== History ==
The station was launched on November 17, 1957. It was the second television station in its small market. WBOY was originally intended to be the ABC affiliate for all of North-Central West Virginia. However, the area's intended NBC affiliate, Parkersburg's WTAP-TV, did not have a signal strong enough to reach Clarksburg and Weston. North-Central West Virginia is a very rugged dissected plateau and WTAP's analog signal on UHF channel 15 was not strong enough to carry across the terrain. After it became clear that Parkersburg and Clarksburg were going to be separate markets, WBOY joined NBC and remains with the network to this day. However, it retained a secondary ABC affiliation for many years. Its original owner was Friendly Broadcasting, who owned several stations including WSTV in Steubenville, Ohio. Rust Craft sold the station to Northern West Virginia TV Broadcasting Company in 1964.

Imes Communications of Columbus, Mississippi, who also owned that city's CBS affiliate WCBI-TV bought the station in 1976, as well as ABC affiliate WMUR-TV in Manchester, New Hampshire. At that time, WBOY dropped the remainder of its ABC programming, allowing it to become a full NBC affiliate; as a result, cable systems began importing Pittsburgh's WTAE-TV for ABC programming. In early 2001, Hearst-Argyle Television (the owner of WTAE-TV) acquired WBOY and WMUR from Imes; Hearst's acquisition of WBOY was finalized on April 30, 2001. In 2000, the FCC started to allow a company to own multiple stations with overlapping coverage areas. However, Hearst opted to keep WTAE-TV (one of its longtime flagship stations) and sold WBOY to West Virginia Media Holdings (which was creating a statewide "network" of stations to share resources) in September 2001; the sale closed on December 13 of that year.

WBOY launched a new second digital subchannel with ABC programming on August 1, 2008, with the branding "Your ABC". Sister station WTRF-TV in Wheeling also launched an ABC subchannel at the same time. Previously, both the Clarksburg–Weston–Fairmont and Wheeling–Steubenville markets were served by WTAE as the de facto affiliate while WDTV aired select ABC Sports programming.

On November 17, 2015, Nexstar Broadcasting Group announced that it would purchase the West Virginia Media Holdings stations, including WBOY-TV, for $130 million. Under the terms of the deal, Nexstar assumed control of the stations through a time brokerage agreement in December 2015, with the sale of the license assets completed on January 31, 2017.

== News operation ==
After being acquired by West Virginia Media Holdings, the station upgraded its news operation and built secondary studios in Morgantown on Scott Avenue. While Morgantown is part of the Pittsburgh market, WBOY has long claimed that city as its primary coverage area; it has been carried on Xfinity's Morgantown cable system and its predecessors since the 1960s. A major emphasis was placed on further ramping up coverage of Morgantown events in the hopes of increasing ratings and thus getting Morgantown reassigned to the Clarksburg–Fairmont market. The move made WBOY the highest rated station in Monongalia County according to Nielsen ratings, beating even Pittsburgh stations. The station produces a large amount of sports content relative to West Virginia University and feeds it to its two sister stations. Today, it is the only former West Virginia Media Holdings station to be the news ratings leader in its respective market.

Nexstar Media produces a half-hour evening newscast that airs at 5:30 p.m. The newscast, titled Tonight Live (formerly West Virginia Tonight), is broadcast live from WOWK's Charleston studios in high definition on WOWK, WBOY, WVNS, WTRF and WDVM and is anchored by Amanda Barren. WBOY-DT2 simulcasts the weekday editions of 12 News at 5 a.m., 6 a.m., noon, 5, 5:30, 6, and 11 p.m. It does not simulcast weekend broadcasts from the main channel. In addition, there is a public affairs program called Inside West Virginia Politics hosted by Rick Johnson, airing Sundays on all five Nexstar West Virginia stations.

=== Notable former staff ===
- Natalie Tennant
- Irv Weinstein
- Erik Wells

== Technical information ==
=== Subchannels ===
The station's signal is multiplexed:

Subchannels of WBOY-TV
Channel	Res.	Short name	Programming
12.1	1080i	WBOYNBC	NBC
12.2	720p	WBOYABC	ABC
12.3	480i	Escape	Ion Mystery (4:3)
12.4	480i	Laff	Laff (4:3)

=== Analog-to-digital conversion ===
WBOY-TV shut down its analog signal, over VHF channel 12, on February 17, 2009, the original target date on which full-power television stations in the United States were to transition from analog to digital broadcasts under federal mandate (which was later pushed back to June 12, 2009). The station's digital signal relocated from its pre-transition UHF channel 52, which was among the high band UHF channels (52-69) that were removed from broadcasting use as a result of the transition, to its analog-era VHF channel 12.
