= Winterplace Ski Resort =

Ski area in West Virginia, United States

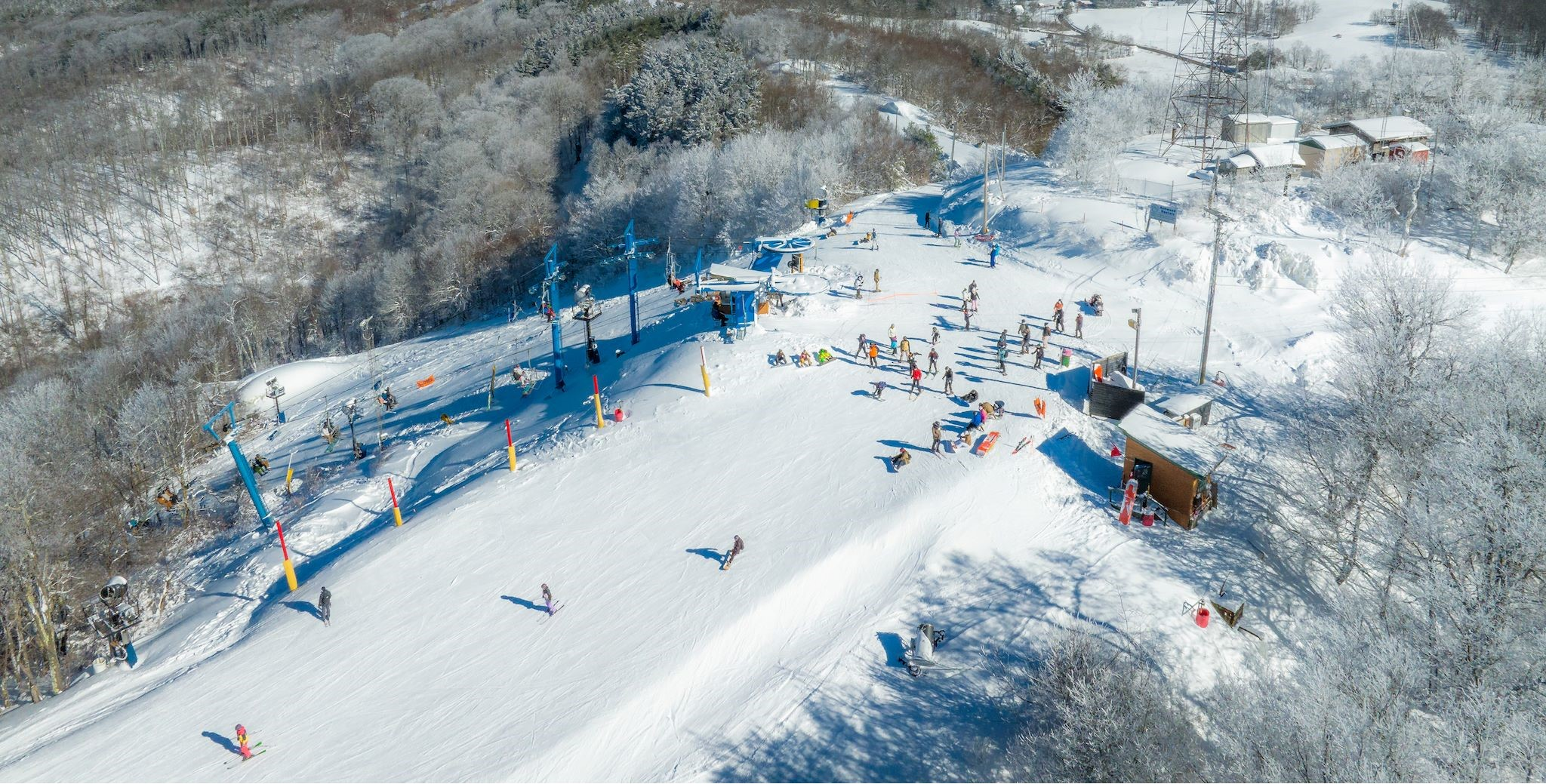
- A drone image of Winterplace from the top of the mountain off of chairlift 3
- Interactive map of Winterplace Ski Resort
- Location: Ghent, West Virginia
- Nearest city: Beckley, West Virginia
- Coordinates: 37°35′24″N 81°06′54″W
- Vertical: 603 ft (184 m)
- Top elevation: 3,600 ft (1,100 m)
- Base elevation: 2,997 ft (913 m)
- Skiable area: 90 acres (0.36 km^{2})
- Trails: 28 total 43% easiest 43% more difficult 14% most difficult
- Longest run: 1.25 mi (2,010 m)
- Lift system: 9 lifts: 2 quad chairs, 3 triple chairs, 2 double chairs, 2 surface lifts
- Lift capacity: 13,000 skiers/hr
- Terrain parks: 2
- Snowfall: 100 inches
- Snowmaking: Yes 100%
- Night skiing: Yes 93%
- Website: http://www.winterplace.com

Winterplace Ski Resort is a ski resort that opened in 1983 and is located in Ghent, West Virginia on Raleigh County's Flat Top Mountain. The southernmost ski resort in West Virginia, Winterplace is a popular attraction due to its proximity to Interstate 77. Winterplace is known for being voted the Best Place To Learn To Ski from Blue Ridge Outdoors Magazine, and more recently, 2024's Top 5 Snowtubing Parks in the U.S. by Newsweek.

== History ==
The first ski resort on Flat Top Mountain was established on the north slope of Bald Knob in 1958. Named Bald Knob Ski Slopes, the resort was the second commercial ski location in West Virginia, following the predecessors of Canaan Valley Ski Resort. It was founded by future West Virginia governor Hulett C. Smith and businessman John McKay, and designed by former Army officer Robert K. Potter. Operating with four tow ropes and a double chair, the resort's longest trail extended 2,800 feet. It was marketed as the southernmost ski resort in the Eastern United States. The resort closed in 1961; the site is now known as Old Winterplace. The current ski resort, sometimes known as New Winterplace, was established fifteen years later on Huff Knob, southeast of the former resort site; the two resort sites are separated by I-77.

== The Mountain ==
Winterplace is nearly equidistant between Beckley, West Virginia to the north on Interstate 77 and Princeton, West Virginia to the south. The resort's southern location and proximity to the north-south I-77 corridor draws visitors from North and South Carolina as well as local skiers from Virginia and West Virginia. The Southern West Virginia visitor's bureau promotes the resort as "the most accessible, affordable ski resort in the Southeast".

The resort's top elevation is 3,600 feet (1,100 m) with a vertical descent of 603 feet (184 m). It has 90 acres (360,000 m^{2}) of skiable area, 28 trails, a terrain park, and nine lifts. The average snowfall for the resort is 100 inches (2.5 m). A fifty million gallon reservoir lake enables supplementary snowmaking at a rate of 7,000 gallons of water per minute. The resort's 16-lane snow tubing facility is cited as the largest in West Virginia.

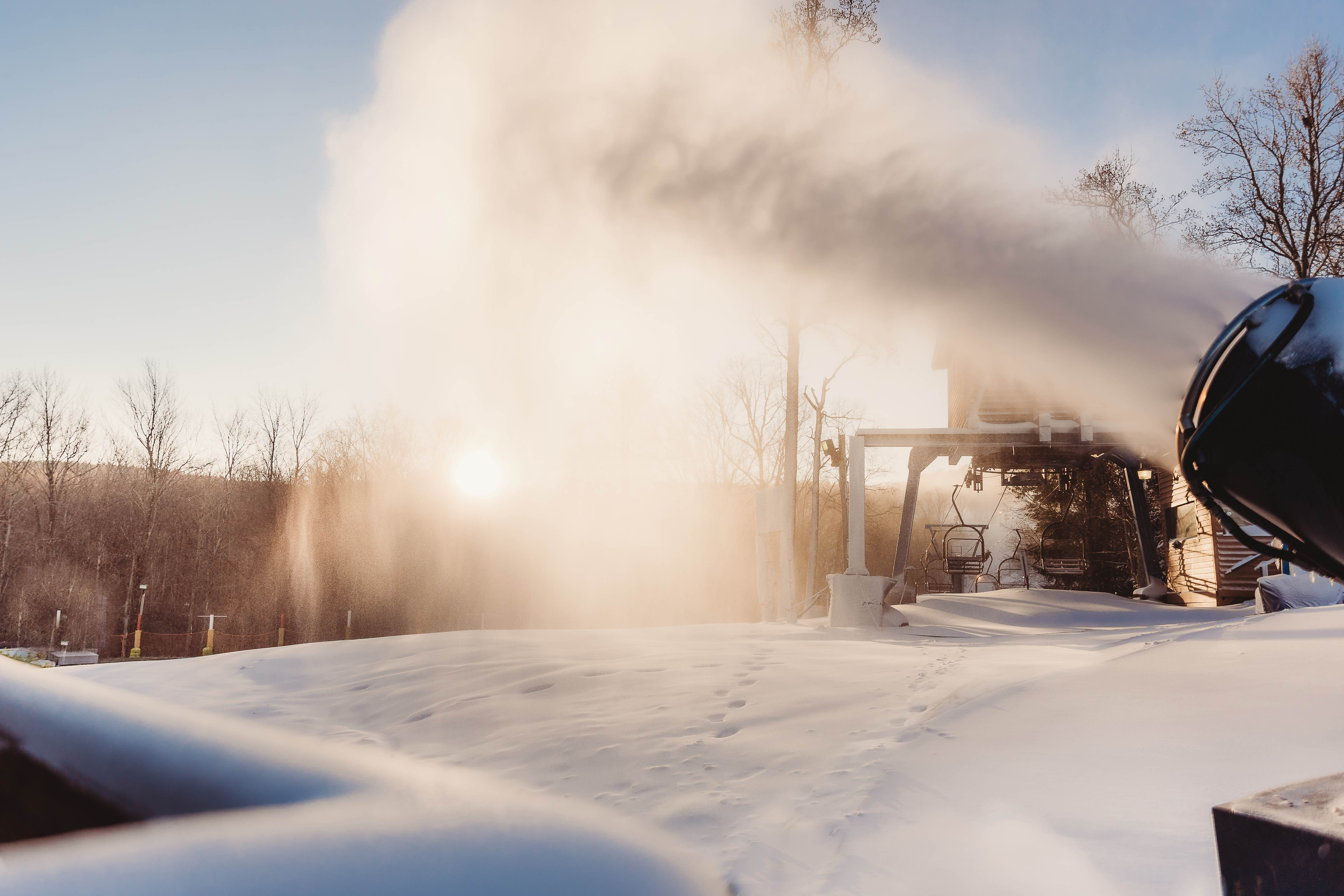
Snowmaking at Winterplace

The resort's ski trails extend up the northern slope of Huff Knob, in the curve of I-77. The terrain in front of the resort complex is devoted to beginner skiing; three chair lifts climb midway up the ridge, providing access to mixed easier and intermediate trails, plus the resort's terrain park and snow tubing facility. Another set of two parallel chairs extends from the resort's mid-mountain lodge to the summit, accessing expert and intermediate terrain. A run of 1.25 miles is available by skiing from the mountain summit to the main base, but multiple chairlift rides are required for return; other trails are a fraction of that length.
