= Bray Cary =

American businessman

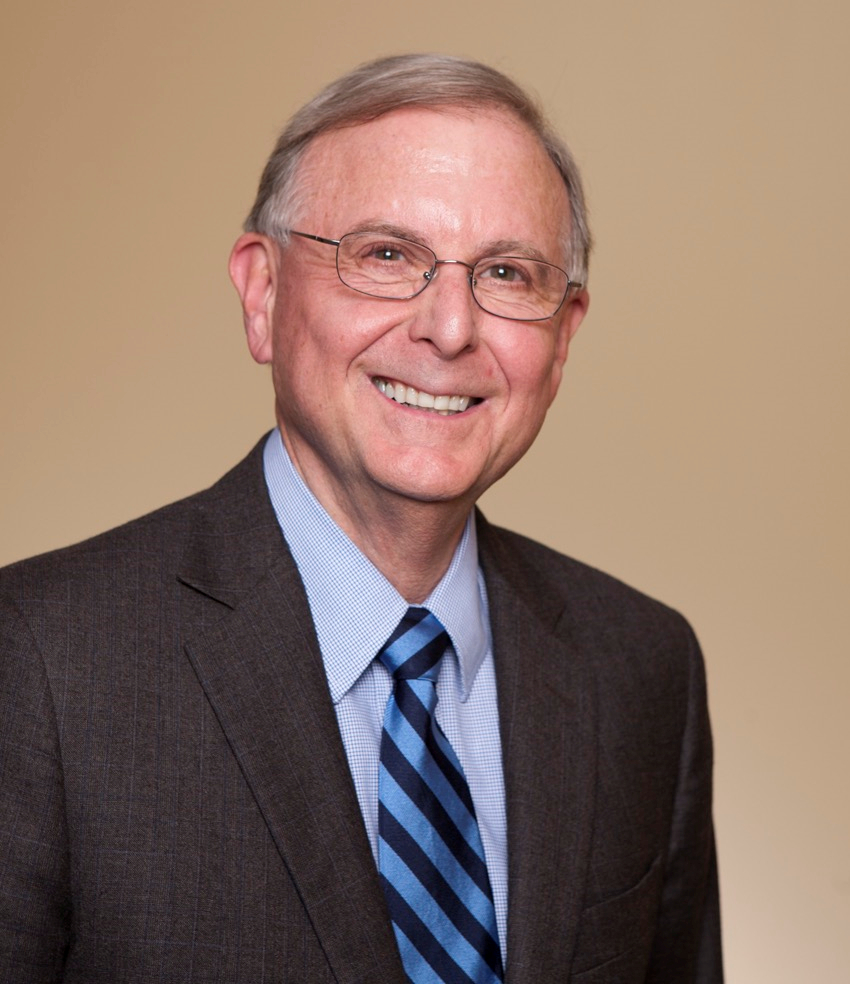
- Born: Albert Bray Cary; June 15, 1948 (age 78); Clifton Forge, Virginia
- Education: West Virginia University
- Political party: Republican Party

Bray Cary, born June 15, 1948, is a Senior Political Advisor as well as a US-based media and sports marketing entrepreneur.

Cary is credited as the architect of the growth of NASCAR through a $2.4B deal with FOX and NBC in 1999 and a historic Internet contract between NASCAR and Turner/AOL in 2000.

In 1984, he founded Creative Sports, a sports & marketing production company based in Charlotte, North Carolina. Creative Sports was acquired by ESPN in 1994 and became ESPN Regional Television.

== Early life ==
Cary was born in Clifton Forge, Virginia, on June 15, 1948. His early life was spent in three West Virginia towns: Huntington, Madison, and Hinton. Attending Hinton High school, he wrote for the Hinton Daily News, an eight-page local paper that served Summers County, West Virginia. Graduating in 1966, he wrote an essay on his desire to pursue a degree in journalism; an essay he later credited with helping him earn a scholarship to West Virginia University. During college Cary worked in WVU's office of Intercollegiate Athletics, combining his interests in journalism and sports. He graduated in 1970, earning a bachelor's degree in journalism and a master's degree in public administration in 1971.

== Career ==
=== Sun Belt Conference ===
After graduating from WVU, Cary served as assistant commissioner in the Sun Belt Conference, a collegiate athletic conference associated with the NCAA's Division 1. During the years he worked there, Cary began the Sun Belt Conference Television Network, producing their sports programming offerings in house and achieving profitability for the network within the first year.

=== Creative Sports ===
In 1984, Cary left the Sun Belt Conference and founded Creative Sports, a sports marketing and production company based in Charlotte, North Carolina. During his years running Creative Sports, the company promoted and handled collegiate athletic television broadcasts in the Atlantic 10 and Big West conferences.

In May 1994, ESPN acquired Creative Sports. The company was awarded exclusive rights to produce for syndication all men's football and basketball games by the Big 10 athletic conference (expanding later to include women's basketball and volleyball). ESPN's acquisition of Creative Sports, renamed ESPN Regional Television, helped fuel ESPN's expansion through the late 1990s into becoming the nation's largest college sports syndication outlet. Cary continued to work as a consultant for ESPN from 1994-1998.

=== NASCAR ===
Cary joined NASCAR in 1998 as VP of Broadcasting and Technology where he helped to consolidate and leverage all television rights for NASCAR races. Cary is credited with being the architect of a six-year, $2.4 billion television deal in 1999 with Fox and NBC that consolidated television rights, increased revenues and was viewed as helping to propel NASCAR from its southern regional roots to a more national presence. In 2000, Cary negotiated what was, at the time, the largest Internet sports contract between NASCAR and Turner/AOL.

=== West Virginia Media Holdings (WVMH) ===
In 2001, Cary, Marty Becker, and other partners raised $100 million from a group local investors to form West Virginia Media Holdings to serve as roll-up vehicle for the acquisition of various West Virginia based media properties. As CEO of WVMH, Cary led the company in the acquisition of eight West Virginia television stations and a weekly business newspaper, The State Journal.

In November 2015, WVMH announced the sale of four of its television stations (WTRF in Wheeling, WVNS in Beckley, WBOY in Clarksburg, WOWK in Charleston & Huntington) to Nexstar, a Texas-based media company. The deal provided Nexstar coverage of the entire state of West Virginia, allowing sharing of content and coverage, and expanding NexStar's reach to 18.1% of US television households.

== Political career ==
Cary secured a place on West Virginia Governor's senior staff as a citizen volunteer and a special assistant. As a part of the position, Cary has access to the Justice's office and to the state's Capitol building. Cary signed a confidentiality agreement for this access.

Republican and Democratic leaders in the state's House of Delegates supported changes to the state's Ethics Act to require people in unpaid roles, like Cary, to still be held to the same high standards of the law. As of 2018, Cary is on payroll at the Governor's office and shapes policy and advocates for the governor.

== Awards ==
- Inducted into the WVU Business Hall of Fame in 2002
- Awarded the “One With Courage” by the West Virginia Child Advocacy Network

== Lawsuit ==
On April 9, 2012 Melinda Heiss, a registered nurse doing contract work for Portamedic, went to Albert Bray Cary Jr.’s office at WOWK-TV. In April 2014, Heiss failed a lawsuit against Cary claiming an insurance physical became a violent encounter after Cary became "very hostile and belligerent." The lawsuit alleges Cary stood in front of a door not allowing Heiss to leave and later pulling a phone away from Heiss, pulling out some of her hair. Cary settled the suit in 2015.
