= Channel 28 TV stations in Mexico =

The following television stations broadcast on digital channel 28 in Mexico:

- XHAJ-TDT on Cerro de las Lajas, Veracruz
- XHAQ-TDT in Mexicali, Baja California
- XHCCQ-TDT in Cancún, Quintana Roo
- XHCHL-TDT in Chilpancingo, Guerrero
- XHCTGD-TDT in Guadalajara, Jalisco
- XHCTHE-TDT in Hermosillo, Sonora
- XHCUM-TDT in Cuernavaca, Morelos
- XHDD-TDT in San Luis Potosí, San Luis Potosí
- XHFAMX-TDT in Mexico City
- XHFCQ-TDT in Felipe Carrillo Puerto, Quintana Roo
- XHGDS-TDT in Granados, Sonora
- XHGK-TDT in Tapachula, Chiapas
- XHHP-TDT in Soto La Marina, Tamaulipas
- XHIXG-TDT in Ixtapa-Zihuatanejo, Guerrero
- XHJK-TDT in Tijuana, Baja California
- XHLPT-TDT in La Paz, Baja California Sur
- XHMAF-TDT in Mazatlán, Sinaloa
- XHMNL-TDT in Monterrey, Nuevo León
- XHMTCH-TDT in Ciudad Juárez, Chihuahua
- XHPFE-TDT in Parras de la Fuente, Coahuila de Zaragoza
- XHSCO-TDT in Salina Cruz, Oaxaca
- XHSGX-TDT in San Agustín Loxicha, Oaxaca
- XHST-TDT in Mérida, Yucatán
- XHTAM-TDT in Reynosa-Matamoros, Tamaulipas
- XHTEN-TDT in Tepic, Nayarit
- XHTHN-TDT in Tehuacán, Puebla
- XHUJED-TDT in Durango, Durango
- XHVAC-TDT in Venustiano Carranza, Chiapas
