= WVNS-TV =

Television station in Lewisburg, West Virginia

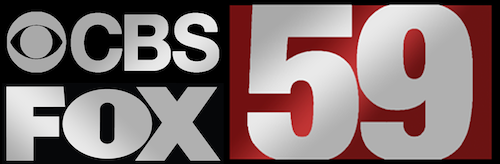
- Lewisburg–Bluefield–; Beckley, West Virginia; United States
- City: Lewisburg, West Virginia
- Channels: Digital: 11 (VHF); Virtual: 59
- Branding: CBS 59; Fox 59; 59 News

Programming
- Affiliations: 59.1: CBS; 59.2: Fox/MyNetworkTV

Ownership
- Owner: Nexstar Media Group; (Nexstar Media Inc.)

History
- Founded: June 18, 1992
- First air date: August 12, 1995
- Former call signs: WVGV-TV (1995–1996); WVSX (1996–2003)
- Former channel numbers: Analog: 59 (UHF, 1995–2009); Digital: 48 (UHF, 2001–2004), 8 (VHF, 2004–2020)
- Former affiliations: The WB (1995–1996); Fox (1996–2001)
- Call sign meaning: "West Virginia's News Station"

Technical information
- Licensing authority: FCC
- Facility ID: 74169
- ERP: 10 kW
- HAAT: 566 m (1,857 ft)
- Transmitter coordinates: 37°46′22.5″N 80°42′25.7″W

Links
- Public license information: Public file; LMS
- Website: www.wvnstv.com

WVNS-TV (channel 59) is a television station licensed to Lewisburg, West Virginia, United States, serving the Bluefield–Beckley–Oak Hill market as an affiliate of CBS, Fox, and MyNetworkTV. The station is owned by Nexstar Media Group, and has studios on Old Cline Road in Ghent, West Virginia; its transmitter is near Alderson, West Virginia.

== History ==
The station began broadcasting on August 12, 1995, as WB affiliate WVGV-TV. It was the first station in the market not affiliated with one of the big three networks. The station was originally set to sign-on in 1994 as a Fox affiliate. However, after the station's launch was delayed past the start of the 1994–95 season, Fox canceled the affiliation. WVGV was not successful due to difficulty in selling advertising time due to the WB's unproven schedule of sitcoms and urbane programming that would struggle to help the network establish a foothold in rural markets. It was also hamstrung by a UHF signal, in a market where the market's stations were dominant and all carried in VHF, which propagates better across the region's mountainous and rugged terrain. Furthermore, the late sign-on made it difficult to get carriage on the area's cable systems. This was a serious problem since cable is a must for acceptable television in this market, most of which is very mountainous.

By May, when cable systems in the area were ready to carry the station, WVGV had agreed to be sold to High Mountain Broadcasting. The new owners took the station dark in order to relocate the studios from Lewisburg to Ghent (between Beckley and Bluefield) and move the transmitter site from Cross Mountain to a more central location to better serve Beckley and Bluefield as well as Lewisburg. The station returned to the air on December 24, 1996, as Fox affiliate WVSX. However, due to problems with the transmitter's unique power supply design, it did not transmit regularly until after January 1, 1997. The station continued to struggle financially.

Relief did not come until WVSX changed its affiliation to CBS on September 29, 2001. Prior to 2001, Bluefield–Beckley–Oak Hill was one of the few markets in the Eastern Time Zone without full service from the Big Three networks. CBS programming had not been available over-the-air in the area since ABC affiliate WOAY-TV dropped the CBS Evening News and Captain Kangaroo from its schedule in the early 1970s; it had dropped most of its CBS programming in 1967. Since the arrival of cable in the market in the late 1970s, Huntington–Charleston's CBS affiliate—WCHS-TV until 1986, and future sister station WOWK-TV since then—had served as the default CBS affiliate for the West Virginia side of the market while WDBJ in Roanoke served the Virginia portion. Both WOWK and WDBJ are still available on most of the area's cable systems. On February 28, 2003, the station was again sold, this time to West Virginia Media Holdings. As a result, the company owned three of the four CBS affiliates serving the state. The call sign was changed on June 7 to the current WVNS-TV.

After a five-year absence, Fox returned to WVNS-TV on a new second digital subchannel on September 13, 2006, following a summer 2006 retransmission dispute between Charleston's WVAH-TV and Suddenlink Communications (the cable system serving Beckley). The demise of the Foxnet cable network (which had served the area for a time in the 1990s) on September 12 also played a role. WVNS turned off its analog signal on UHF channel 59 at 12:30 p.m. on February 17, 2009. Although WVNS transmits its digital signal on VHF channel 8, it remaps to virtual channel 59.

On November 17, 2015, Nexstar Broadcasting Group announced that it would purchase the West Virginia Media Holdings stations, including WVNS-TV, for $130 million. Under the terms of the deal, Nexstar assumed control of the stations through a time brokerage agreement in December 2015, with the sale of the license completed on January 31, 2017.

== News operation ==
Soon after West Virginia Media bought the station, it launched a news department. News broadcasts at 5 a.m., 6 a.m., noon, 5, 6, 10 and 11 p.m. are anchored and produced from the primary WVNS studios located in Ghent. The station also takes advantage of the statewide network to share news content from sister stations WOWK-TV (for state government coverage and Marshall University sports) and WBOY-TV (for West Virginia University sports). Nexstar Media Group produces a half-hour evening newscast that airs at 5:30 p.m. The newscast, titled Tonight Live, is broadcast live from the Charleston studios in high definition on all of Nexstar's West Virginia stations. Every night at 10 p.m., the Fox subchannel offers a live, hour-long newscast known as Fox 59 News anchored by Riley Phillips. Weekday mornings at 7 a.m., there is a rebroadcast of the second hour of the main channel's weekday morning show.

On March 28, 2013, WVNS was the last station in the market and the third station owned by West Virginia Media Holdings to upgrade its local newscasts to high definition. With the upgrade came new graphics and a new redesigned set.

In September 2016, following the acquisition by Nexstar Media Group, WVNS moved its weather operation that was located at its Charleston sister station, WOWK, to Ghent. WVNS' weather department and meteorologists are now based out of their home studio with a new state-of-the-art studio and weather system by Baron Services.

== Subchannels ==
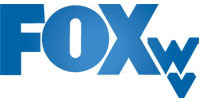
Former 59.2 logo as "Fox WV"

The station's signal is multiplexed:

Subchannels of WVNS-TV
Channel	Res.	Short name	Programming
59.1	1080i	WVNSCBS	CBS
59.2	720p	WVNSFOX	Fox / MyNetworkTV
