= KCOS-LP =

Television station in Phoenix, Arizona (1995–2011)

- Phoenix, Arizona; United States
- Channels: Analog: 28 (UHF)

Ownership
- Owner: Aracelis Ortiz Corporation

History
- Founded: June 26, 1995
- First air date: 1998
- Last air date: January 31, 2011
- Former call signs: K28FV, K68FB (CP only)
- Former affiliations: LFN, HTVN
- Call sign meaning: Carlos Ortiz Sr., original permittee

Technical information
- Licensing authority: FCC
- Facility ID: 8988
- ERP: 63 kW
- HAAT: 295 m (968 ft)
- Transmitter coordinates: 33°29′39.1″N 111°38′30.4″W

Links
- Public license information: LMS

KCOS-LP (channel 28) was a low-power television station in Phoenix, Arizona, United States. Owned by Aracelis Ortiz Corporation of Harlingen, Texas, the station broadcast from the Usery Mountains in Mesa. Despite the similar call letters, KCOS-LP was not related to full-service PBS member station KCOS in El Paso, Texas.

== History ==
The original construction permit for KCOS-LP was granted on June 26, 1995, to Carlos Ortiz Sr., pastor of Faith Pleases God Church in Harlingen, Texas. The station was to broadcast on channel 68, but was moved to channel 28 in anticipation of the Federal Communications Commission (FCC)'s requirement to vacate the 700 MHz band. It was licensed as K28FV on January 8, 1998, programming unknown. In January 2000, Hispanic Television Network, Inc. assumed operation of the station and changed the programming to Spanish-language network HTVN, although Carlos Ortiz remained the owner. Later that year, the station took the call letters KCOS-LP. Shortly afterward, Carlos Ortiz died and his widow, Aracelis Ortiz, as executrix of the estate, became the new owner. The station became part of Aracelis Ortiz Corporation in 2001. That same year, KCOS-LP was granted Class A status. By May 2002, the Ortiz family had resumed operation of the station, as Mrs. Ortiz stated in a Petition for Reconsideration of an FCC Notice of Apparent Liability (NAL) that the station was broadcasting programming from La Familia Network (LFN) at the time of the cited violation, which occurred in May 2002. Like Fe-TV, LFN is a television service from Faith Pleases God Church. The station was silent for a time, but resumed operations in 2004 with programming from Fe-TV, then returned to LFN in 2005. The April 2006 magazine from Fe-TV lists the station as an affiliate.

Screen capture of KCOS-LP station ID slate. The ID slate was displayed on the screen while Fe-TV was off the air from August 2006 to September 2007. Music played in the background on a three-song rotation.

In July and August 2006, the station had various technical difficulties, prompting them to air a slate in English advising viewers of trouble with the video signal on the station's end. In August 2006, the station once again began airing Fe-TV, but shortly afterward changed to a station identification slate (pictured). The August 2006 update of the website for Fe-TV stated that the network was to be off the air for six months for rebuilding and expansion. The station went silent again in mid-2007, but returned in September 2007, first broadcasting programming from Fe-TV, then switching to LFN.

In August 2011, the station voluntarily reverted from Class A to low-power status after being challenged by the FCC for failure to file for the fourth quarter in 2008 and all four quarters in 2009 and 2010 the children's television programming reports required of all Class A licensees. By this time, however, KCOS-LP had already broadcast for the final time. Its lease on its Usery Mountain tower expired January 31, 2011, without being renewed.

On October 7, 2014, the station's license was canceled by the FCC for failure to file a renewal application. Three weeks later, on October 30, Aracelis Ortiz Corporation re-applied for the license to the FCC. On March 15, 2016, the FCC granted the license renewal.

On July 19, 2021, KCOS-LP's license was canceled by the FCC, as the station had failed to convert to digital operation by the July 13, 2021, deadline.

== Digital television ==
In May 2006, the FCC opened a brief application period in which low-power television licensees and permittees could apply for a digital companion channel by short-form application. KCOS-LP applied for VHF channel 13, to broadcast from the same location as the analog station. In September, the FCC identified the station as a singleton applicant, meaning that there were no competing applications on the same or adjacent channels, and giving the station until October 31 to file a long-form application. On October 2, 2006, KCOS-LP formally applied for a digital companion channel on VHF channel 13, but no construction permit was granted. On November 7, 2011, KCOS-LP filed an application to flash-cut the station from analog to digital.
