= ESPN Events =

Sporting event promotion company

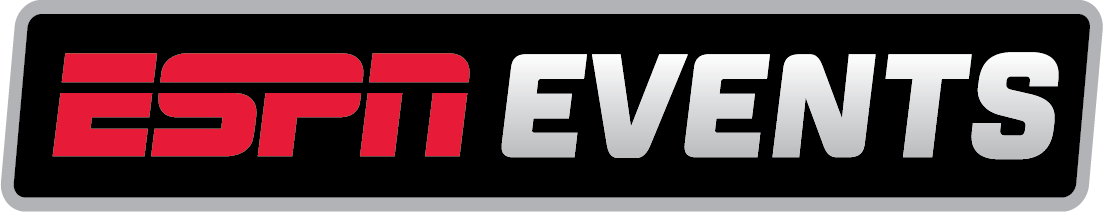
- Type: Subsidiary
- Industry: Sports promoter
- Predecessor: Creative Sports; Ohlmeyer Communications Corporation; ESPN Plus; ESPN Regional Television
- Founded: 1996; 30 years ago
- Headquarters: Charlotte, North Carolina, United States
- Key people: Clint Overby (vice president)
- Owners: The Walt Disney Company (72%; via ABC Inc.); Hearst Communications (18%); National Football League (10%)
- Parent: ESPN
- Website: espnevents.com

ESPN Events is an American multinational sporting event promoter owned by ESPN. It is headquartered in Charlotte, North Carolina, and shares its operations with SEC Network and formerly with ESPNU. The corporation organizes sporting events for broadcast across the ESPN family of networks, including, most prominently, a group of college football bowl games and in-season college basketball tournaments.

ESPN Events previously operated primarily as a syndicator of college sports broadcasts; the company was founded as Creative Sports, a sports programming syndicator that merged with Don Ohlmeyer's OCC Sports in 1996. After ESPN purchased the merged company, the division was renamed ESPN Regional Television (ERT), which distributed telecasts for syndication on broadcast stations and regional sports networks; these telecasts were also available on the ESPN GamePlan and ESPN Full Court out-of-market sports packages. Most of ERT's broadcasts were presented under the on-air branding ESPN Plus (not to be confused with ESPN+, the current subscription service), but this name was later phased out in favor of dedicated on-air brands for each package, such as SEC Network (later renamed SEC TV as to not be confused with the then-upcoming SEC Network cable channel).

Following its acquisition of the Las Vegas Bowl in 2001, ERT began to double as an organizer of sporting events. The subdivision, which later began to operate under the name ESPN Events, would acquire and establish other bowl games to provide additional post-season opportunities for bowl-eligible teams. ESPN Events also organizes several pre-season tournaments in college basketball, as well as the season-opening Camping World Kickoff and Texas Kickoff football games. All ESPN Events are broadcast by ESPN's networks.

ESPN Regional Television began to wind down its syndication operations in the 2010s, as the proliferation of competing outlets (including other sports channels, conference-specific networks such as ESPN's own SEC Network, as well as digital services such as ESPN's own ESPN3 and ESPN+ platforms) took over most of the conference rights and overflow formerly held by the company.

== History ==
The company traces its history to Creative Sports, Inc., a North Carolina-based sports syndicator owned and founded by Bray Cary. ESPN, LLC purchased Creative Sports, Inc. and OCC Sports, Inc. in the mid-1990s.

On July 22, 1994, ESPN Regional Television was incorporated in Delaware. ESPN Regional Television was formed in 1996, through ESPN Inc.'s combination of Creative Sports and OCC Sports, under the direction of Chuck Gerber and Loren Matthews. In January 2000, Loren Matthews left ESPN Regional Television for an executive position at sister division ABC Sports. By February 2000, ERT acquired the production rights to the Arena Football League; this included responsibilities for AFL broadcasts on The Nashville Network, which had ESPN retain duties for the events in lieu of its own unit, World Sports Enterprises.

In 2001, ESPN Regional Television moved beyond broadcasting college football bowl games, when it purchased the Las Vegas Bowl from Las Vegas Convention and Visitors Authority. ESPN Regional did so to help partner conferences that had bowl qualified teams but no bowl available. The company bought four more bowls and started two others.

In August 2008, ESPN reached a 15-year, $2.25 billion broadcast rights agreement with the SEC. As part of the deal, ESPN also assumed the syndicated package of games previously held by Raycom Sports; beginning in 2009, ERT syndicated SEC football and basketball under the SEC Network brand.

The original business of ESPN Regional Television began to grow obsolete with the launch of dedicated networks dedicated to specific conferences, including the Big Ten Network, Pac-12 Network, and the ESPN-operated SEC Network, since they largely assumed rights to the game packages that ESPN had previously syndicated. As such, the division pivoted to focusing solely on organizing events, particularly within college football and basketball.

Derzis retired in 2021, and the division is led by vice president Clint Overby.

== Broadcast rights ==
Logo of ESPN Plus, the branding initially used for ESPN's syndicated telecasts.

=== Former rights ===
ESPN Plus held the rights to Conference USA football and basketball, Mountain West Conference football and basketball, Big Ten Conference football and basketball, and various other collegiate conferences, but has lost them as detailed below:

- American Athletic Conference men's college basketball (starting with the 2008 football season, under the old Big East contract; games were branded as Big East Network, later the American Athletic Network, with SportsNet New York as the flagship station). As of the 2019 football season, the AAC entered into a 12-year media rights agreement with ESPN.
- Big 12 Conference basketball (telecasts from the conference became branded under the Big 12 Network name beginning in the 2008–09 season) All Big 12 basketball games moved to ESPN linear channels after the 2013–2014 season.
- Conference USA – Broadcast rights were for regular-season football games. American Sports Network (a unit of Sinclair Broadcast Group that initially operated under a very similar model to ERT) began to syndicate other C-USA games with the 2014 season. Currently, its rights are held by CBS Sports Network, ESPN, NFL Network, and until 2017, ASN's successor Stadium.
- Mid-American Conference basketball – Broadcast rights were assumed by SportsTime Ohio in 2010; Sportstime Ohio lost the rights to American Sports Network in 2015.
- Mountain West Conference – Broadcast rights to MW football and basketball games are now held by CBS Sports Network and Fox Sports (conference rights were previously held by the now-defunct MountainWest Sports Network).
- Big Ten Conference – Big Ten Network assumed the packages held by ESPN Regional Television upon its launch in August 2007.
- Southeastern Conference (SEC) – Broadcast rights to SEC football and basketball games not selected to air on ESPN or CBS were assumed by the SEC Network beginning in the 2014–15 academic season. The conference rights were previously held by Raycom Sports, and before that Lincoln Financial Sports (formerly Jefferson Pilot Sports from 1987 to 2009); from the beginning of ESPN's SEC contract in the 2009–10 season, ERT produced syndicated broadcasts branded as SEC Network (later rebranded as SEC TV in 2013 as not to be confused with the incoming cable network) as a successor to the Raycom Sports SEC package.
- Sun Belt Conference football and men's basketball (telecasts from the conference are branded under the Sun Belt Network name). The Sun Belt Network ceased operations in 2014.
- Western Athletic Conference – ESPN Plus broadcast WAC men's and women's basketball until 2014, when American Sports Network won those syndication rights, beginning with the 2014–15 season.

== On-air staff ==
=== College football ===
- Cara Capuano – Southeastern Conference sideline reporter (2009–2012)
- Paul Carcaterra – Big East Conference sideline reporter (2012)
- Doug Chapman – Mid-America Conference color commentator (2009–2012; alternating from 2010 onward)
- John Congemi – Big East Conference color commentator (2009–2011)
- David Diaz-Infante – Big East Conference color commentator (2012)
- Doug Graber – Mid-America Conference color commentator (2010–2012; alternating)
- Mike Gleason – Big East Conference play-by-play (2009–2011)
- Quint Kessenich – Big East Conference sideline reporter (2009)
- Eamon McAnaney – Big East Conference sideline reporter (2010–2011), play-by-play (2012)
- Dave Neal – Southeastern Conference play-by-play (2009–2012)
- Michael Reghi – Mid-America Conference play-by-play (2009–2012)
- Andre Ware – Southeastern Conference color commentator (2009–2012)

=== College basketball ===
- Dave Armstrong – Big 12 Conference play-by-play (2010–2013)
- Dave Baker – Southeastern Conference play-by-play (2012–2013)
- Carter Blackburn – Southeastern Conference play-by-play (2010–2012)
- Barry Booker – Southeastern Conference sideline reporter (2012–2013)
- Joe Dean Jr. – Southeastern Conference sideline reporter (2010–2013)
- Reid Gettys – Big 12 Conference color commentator (2010–2013)
- Mark Gottfried – Southeastern Conference sideline reporter (2010–2011)
- Mike Gleason – Big East Conference play-by-play (2010–2012)
- Mitch Holthus – Big 12 Conference play-by-play (2010–2013)
- Stephen Howard – Big 12 Conference color commentator (2010–2013)
- Kara Lawson – Southeastern Conference sideline reporter (2011–2013)
- Dave LaMont – Southeastern Conference color commentator (2012–2013)
- Kyle Macy – Southeastern Conference sideline reporter (2012–2013)
- Bryndon Manzer – Big 12 Conference color commentator (2010–2013)
- Clay Matvick – Southeastern Conference color commentator (2010–2013)
- Dave Neal – Southeastern Conference color commentator (2012–2013)
- Chris Piper – Big 12 Conference sideline reporter (2012–2013)
- Brad Sham – Big 12 Conference play-by-play (2010–2013)
- Anish Shroff – Big East Conference play-by-play (2012–2013)
- Jon Sundvold – Big 12 Conference color commentator (2010–2012)
- Bob Wenzel – Big East Conference color commentator (2010–2013)
- Rich Zvosec – Big 12 Conference sideline reporter (2012–2013)

== Events ==
ERT acquired its first bowl game in 2001, with its purchase of the Las Vegas Bowl from the Las Vegas Convention and Visitors Authority. The company moved into the area as it saw that some of their conference partners had teams that were bowl-eligible, but with no bowl available to take them. By 2013, ERT had founded two new bowl games and purchased four additional games. The games primarily serve as a source of live content for ESPN during the early weeks of bowl season, prior to the larger, traditional games in proximity to New Year's Day (such as the New Year's Six games of the College Football Playoff, which are also broadcast by ESPN). This strategy has been successful for ESPN, although it has in recent years contributed to an oversaturation of bowl games that have prevented them from all being populated by bowl-eligible teams. ESPN also runs the Celebration Bowl in Division I FCS, which is played between the champions of the Mid-Eastern Athletic Conference (MEAC) and the Southwestern Athletic Conference (SWAC) — the two prominent conferences of historically black colleges and universities.

ESPN Events operates the following 17 bowl games, which ESPN televises:

- Armed Forces Bowl
- Birmingham Bowl
- Bahamas Bowl
- Boca Raton Bowl
- Celebration Bowl (FCS)
- Cure Bowl
- Famous Idaho Potato Bowl
- Fenway Bowl
- First Responder Bowl
- Frisco Bowl
- Gasparilla Bowl
- Hawaii Bowl
- Las Vegas Bowl
- Myrtle Beach Bowl
- New Mexico Bowl
- Salute to Veterans Bowl
- Texas Bowl

ESPN Events also organizes several opening weekend games, such as the Camping World Kickoff, Advocare Texas Kickoff, and FCS Kickoff.

ESPN Events is also involved in college basketball, operating early-season events such as the AdvoCare Invitational, the Champions Classic, the Jimmy V Classic, the NIT Season Tip-Off, and the Phil Knight Invitational.

== College marketing division ==
The company's success with college tournament operation and broadcasting led ESPN Regional Television to form a college marketing division, which provides colleges all-in-one services for selling sponsorships, local media rights and other marketing campaigns. The University of South Florida, the University of Kansas and the University of Oregon are some of the clients that the division began representing in 2000.

Preceded by Raycom Sports (before merger of the Big Eight and SWC)	Syndication Rights Holder to the Big 12 Conference; 1996–2014 (under Big 12 Network branding, 2008–2014)	Succeeded by ESPN networks
Preceded by Raycom Sports	Syndication Rights Holder to the Big Ten Conference; 1996–2007	Succeeded by Big Ten Network (cable-exclusive)
Preceded by Raycom Sports (before the merger of the Metro and Great Midwest Conferences)	Syndication Rights Holder to the Conference USA; 1996–2014	Succeeded by American Sports Network
Preceded by Raycom Sports	Syndication Rights Holder to the Southeastern Conference; 2009–2014 (under SEC TV branding)	Succeeded by SEC Network (cable-only)
