= List of television stations in Vermont =

This is a list of broadcast television stations that are licensed in the U.S. state of Vermont.

== Full-power ==
- Stations are arranged by media market served and channel position.

Full-power television stations in Vermont
Media market	Station	Channel	Primary affiliation(s)	Notes	Refs
Burlington	WCAX-TV	3	CBS		
Burlington	WVNY	22	ABC		
Burlington	WNNE	31	The CW	(Note: Licensed to Montpelier, Vermont.)	
Burlington	WETK	33	PBS (Vermont Public)		
Burlington	WFFF-TV	44	Fox		
Rural Vermont	WVTB	20	PBS (Vermont Public)	(Note: Licensed to St. Johnsbury, Vermont.) (Note: Satellite of WETK.)	
Rural Vermont	WVER	28	PBS (Vermont Public)	(Note: Licensed to Rutland, Vermont.)	

== Low-power ==
Low-power television stations in Vermont
Media market	Station	Channel	Primary affiliation(s)	Notes	Refs
Rural Vermont	W28DQ-D	21	3ABN	(Note: Licensed to Windsor, Vermont.)	
~Hartford, CT	WHNH-CD	2	Daystar	(Note: Licensed to Manchester, Vermont.)	
~Albany, NY	WZPJ-LD	21	3ABN	(Note: Licensed to Bennington, Vermont.)	

== Translators ==
Television station translators in Vermont
Media market	Station	Channel	Translating	Notes	Refs
Burlington	W25BT-D	25	WCFE-TV	(Note: Licensed to Monkton, Vermont.)	
Rural Vermont	W23EU-D	3	WCAX-TV		
Rural Vermont	WVER-1 (DST)	28	WVER	(Note: Licensed to Mount Pleasant, Vermont.)	
Rural Vermont	WVER-2 (DST)	28	WVER	(Note: Licensed to Mount Ascutney, Vermont.)	
Rural Vermont	WVER-4 (DST)	28	WVER	(Note: Licensed to Brattleboro, Vermont.)	
Rural Vermont	WVER-5 (DST)	28	WVER		
Rural Vermont	W30DM-D	30	WVER		
~Albany, NY	W20EH-D	46	WVER	(Note: Licensed to Pownal, Vermont.)	
