= KJNK-LD =

Television station in Minneapolis

- Minneapolis–Saint Paul, Minnesota; United States
- City: Minneapolis, Minnesota
- Channels: Digital: 25 (UHF); Virtual: 25
- Branding: Telemundo Minnesota

Programming
- Affiliations: 25.1: Telemundo; for others, see § Subchannels

Ownership
- Owner: Innovate Corp.; (HC2 Station Group, Inc.)
- Sister stations: K33LN-D, KMNV, KMNQ

History
- First air date: April 9, 1984
- Former call signs: K58BS (1984–1994); K65GC (1994–1997); K65GV (1997–1998); K58BS (1998–2005); K25IA (2005–2009); K25IA-D (2009–2014)
- Former channel number: Analog: 58 (UHF, 1984–1994 and 1998–2005), 65 (UHF, 1994–1998), 25 (UHF, 2005–2009)
- Former affiliations: TBN (1984–2013, November 2013–November 2014); Informed TV (September–November 2013)

Technical information
- Licensing authority: FCC
- Facility ID: 67955
- Class: LD
- ERP: 15 kW
- HAAT: 243.3 m (798 ft)
- Transmitter coordinates: 44°58′34.0″N 93°16′21″W
- Translator(s): K28OH-D St. James

Links
- Public license information: LMS
- Website: http://telemundominnesota.com/

KJNK-LD (channel 25) is a low-power television station licensed to Minneapolis, Minnesota, United States, serving the Twin Cities area as an affiliate of the Spanish-language network Telemundo. The station is owned by Innovate Corp. KJNK-LD's transmitter is located at the IDS Center in downtown Minneapolis.

KJNK-LD also serves the Mankato market (via K28OH-D in nearby St. James through the local municipal-operated Cooperative TV (CTV) network of translators.)

== History ==
The station began as K58BS upon signing on the air for the first time on April 9, 1984, as a local translator for the Trinity Broadcasting Network. It became K65GC in 1994 when it was moved to UHF channel 65. The station was K65GV from 1997 to 1998.

They got their original K58BS callsign back in 1998 and it stayed with them until 2005, when the station moved to UHF channel 25 and became K25IA. Their digital counterpart, K25IA-D, signed on in 2009 in order for the station to upgrade to digital.

On April 13, 2012, TBN sold 36 of its translators, including K25IA-D, to Regal Media, Inc. Regal Media is headed by George Cooney, the CEO of the EUE/Screen Gems studios.

Following its acquisition by Regal Media, K25IA-D continued to carry all five TBN services. This ended in September 2013, when all TBN services were dropped in favor of Informed TV, a series of video lectures from Alan Roebke, a former Congressional candidate from Minnesota's 7th congressional district. Informed TV's programming is also carried on a subchannel of K21GN-D, a Selective TV translator in Alexandria, where the organization's headquarters are located. This ended in mid-November 2013, when K25IA-D resumed carriage of TBN and its subchannels.

Regal Media sold K25IA-D to King Forward in 2014. On June 9, 2014, the station changed its call sign to the current KJNK-LD. The station became a Telemundo affiliate on November 23, 2014, with Sunrise, Florida–based company DTV America Corporation becoming the operator of the station. That same day, KJNK's second subchannel began featuring programming from Doctor TV, a new upstart healthy-lifestyle network featuring the latest in medical breakthroughs, fitness programs, and other healthy living programming, with some programming from The Worship Network being shown during parts of the overnight hours. In terms of Spanish-language programming, KJNK competed with WUMN-LP, which is affiliated with Univision, one of Telemundo's main competitors.

On February 12, 2015, Comcast cable began carrying KJNK on Xfinity channel 100 and Xfinity Digital channel 624. Later that year, DrTV was replaced by the Sonlife Broadcasting Network on channel 25.2, with 25.3 carrying Hmong language programming for the local Hmong-American community. King Forward sold its stations, including KJNK-LD, to HC2 Holdings in 2017.

== Technical information ==
=== Subchannels ===
The station's signal is multiplexed:

Subchannels of KJNK-LD
Subchannel	Res.	Short name	Programming
25.1	1080i	KJNK-LD	Telemundo
25.2	480i	KJNK-LD	SonLife (4:3)
25.3	480i	KJNK-LD	Cozi TV
25.4	480i	KJNK-LD	NBC True CRMZ
25.5	480i	KJNK-LD	Infomercials (4:3)
25.6	480i	KJNK-LD	Defy

=== Translator ===
- K28OH-D St. James (in the Mankato market)
