= West Virginia Media Holdings =

Media company in West Virginia, United States

West Virginia Media Holdings, LLC
- Type: Private
- Industry: Media
- Founded: 2001
- Founder: Bray Cary
- Defunct: January 31, 2017
- Fate: Acquired by Nexstar
- Successor: Nexstar Media Group
- Headquarters: Charleston, West Virginia, United States
- Area served: West Virginia
- Key people: Bray Cary (President & CEO)
- Products: Broadcast television

West Virginia Media Holdings was a media company in West Virginia. It owned television stations in each of the four main media markets in the state, as well as a weekly newspaper.

The group owned WOWK-TV in Huntington, WVNS-TV in Lewisburg, and WTRF-TV in Wheeling, West Virginia, which were all affiliated with the CBS network; and WBOY-TV in Clarksburg which was affiliated with NBC. WVNS and WTRF also carried Fox on their digital subchannels, while both subchannels carried MyNetworkTV in addition to Fox as a secondary affiliate. It also owned a weekly newspaper, The State Journal, which mainly covers state commerce and political news.

The group was founded in 2001. The largest private investor in the company was Bray Cary, who served as president and CEO. Cary was formerly an executive with NASCAR, and was responsible for its television contracts before they switched to a bulk network model, along with college basketball syndication.

In August 2008, both WTRF and WBOY began carrying ABC programming on their digital subchannel. Previously, longtime ABC affiliate WTAE-TV in Pittsburgh served both markets as the de facto ABC affiliate and remains on cable in both markets (Fox Ohio Valley replaced WPGH on Comcast systems as the only Fox affiliate on the Comcast channel lineup).

On November 17, 2015, WVMH announced that it would sell its stations to Nexstar Broadcasting Group for $130 million. The company would take over the stations' non-license assets under a time brokerage agreement in December 2015 until the formal completion of the deal, expected in late-2016. The two companies viewed the acquisition as being a complement to Nexstar's WHAG-TV, whose coverage area includes the Eastern Panhandle region. Nexstar CEO Perry A. Sook is an alumnus of WOWK. The sale was completed on January 31, 2017.

The State Journal was separately acquired by NCWV Media in December 2016.

== Former stations ==
- Stations are arranged in alphabetical order by state and city of license.

Media market	State	Station	Purchased	Sold	Notes
Clarksburg–Fairmont–Morgantown	West Virginia	WBOY-TV	2001	2017	
Huntington–Charleston	West Virginia	WOWK-TV	2002	2017	
Lewisburg–Bluefield–Beckley	West Virginia	WVNS-TV	2003	2017	
Wheeling	West Virginia	WTRF-TV	2002	2017	
