= KVPX-LD =

Television station in Las Vegas

ATSC 3.0 station
- Las Vegas, Nevada; United States
- Channels: Digital: 28 (UHF); Virtual: 28

Programming
- Affiliations: see § Subchannels

Ownership
- Owner: Innovate Corp.; (HC2 Station Group, Inc.)

History
- Founded: February 20, 1992
- Former call signs: K59ER (1992–1998); KVPX-LP (1998–2011)
- Former affiliations: Pax TV; Multimedios (until 2006); Almavision (2006–2013); Sonlife Broadcasting Network (2013–2022); BeIN Sports Xtra (2022–202?); Infomercials (202?–202?)
- Call sign meaning: Vegas Pax (former affiliation)

Technical information
- Licensing authority: FCC
- Facility ID: 8887
- Class: LD
- ERP: 150 kW
- HAAT: 37 m (121 ft)

Links
- Public license information: LMS

KVPX-LD (channel 28) is a low-power television station in Las Vegas, Nevada, United States. The station is owned by Innovate Corp. The station's transmitter is located in Henderson.

== History ==
In June 2013, KVPX-LD was slated to be sold to Landover 5 as part of a larger deal involving 51 other low-power television stations; the sale fell through in June 2016.

During the 2015 Consumer Electronic Show in Las Vegas, it was reported that KVPX was used for demonstrating the new ATSC 3.0 technique in 4K-UHD.

Mako Communications sold its stations, including KVPX-LD, to HC2 Holdings in 2017.

== Subchannels ==
The station's digital signal is multiplexed:

Subchannels of KVPX-LD
Subchannel	Res.	Short name	Programming
28.1	—N/a	DFYA3MT	Defy
28.2	—N/a	FTBA3MT	CCX Sports
