= WLPC-CD =

Television station in Reford, Michigan

- Redford–Detroit, Michigan; United States
- City: Redford, Michigan
- Channels: Digital: 28 (UHF); Virtual: 28
- Branding: The Impact Network

Programming
- Affiliations: 28.1: Religious

Ownership
- Owner: Glenn and Karin Plummer; (WLPC LLC)

History
- First air date: September 25, 1986
- Former call signs: For cancelled WLPC-LP: W26AB (1986–1996); WLPC-LP (1996–2015); For WLPC-CD: WLPC-LD (2011–2014)
- Former channel numbers: Analog: 26 (UHF, 1986–2011); Digital: 40 (UHF, 2011–2019
- Former affiliations: America One (1986–1998); Worship Network (late 1980s–early 1990s); FamilyNet (early 1990s); My Family TV (2008–2014)
- Call sign meaning: Plummer Communications (current owner)

Technical information
- Licensing authority: FCC
- Facility ID: 168471
- Class: CD
- ERP: 4 kW; 1.25 kW (CP)
- HAAT: 132.6 m (435 ft); 300.1 m (985 ft) (CP)
- Transmitter coordinates: 42°19′55″N 83°2′42″W; 42°26′52.5″N 83°10′23.1″W (CP)

Links
- Public license information: Public file; LMS
- Website: https://www.wlpc.tv/; https://www.watchimpact.com/

WLPC-CD (channel 28) is a low-power, Class A religious television station licensed to Redford, Michigan, United States, serving the Detroit area. The station is owned by Glenn and Karin Plummer.

WLPC could be received over-the-air in the immediate Detroit area, and portions of downtown and south Windsor, Ontario, with an indoor or outdoor antenna. However, in exceptional tropospheric propagation situations it could be received as far north as Lapeer County.

== History ==
Previous logo for WLPC, as CTN.

The station was originally affiliated with America One from 1986 until 1998. It also carried the Worship Network in the late 1980s and early 1990s. It gained FamilyNet in the early 1990s, before becoming an all-FN affiliate.

On December 13, 2010, CHWI-TV announced that it would be moving its Windsor repeater from channel 60 to channel 26 starting on January 8, 2011. WLPC-LP, using an unprotected channel allocation, was forced off the air at that time.

On January 28, 2011, WLPC-LP was granted a Special Temporary Authority to relocate its analog feed to channel 38, a frequency formerly used by WADL, but has not done so. This STA expired without incident on July 28, 2011, and the station's owner, Pastor Glenn R. Plummer, filed a Notification of Suspension of Operations with the FCC on April 21, 2011, declaring that the station had terminated all over-the-air broadcasts, without a request for an extension of a Silent STA. However, during the time the station was not broadcasting terrestrially, it was still available on Comcast digital cable in Southeastern Michigan.

Sometime in 2011, the station had moved its website to time4change.com, and begun streaming online at Dashboard - The Impact Network, as The Impact Network. Prior to this, the station had operated under the name "Christian Television Network" (CTN) but was forced to drop this branding at the behest of a different Christian Television Network, the Clearwater, Florida–based network of the same name.

At sometime in mid-November 2011, WLPC-LP had converted to digital as WLPC-LD, broadcasting on channel 40 from its tower atop the Cadillac Tower. The station broadcasts its sole digital stream with a virtual channel of 40.1.

On May 27, 2014, WLPC-LD's call letters were officially upgraded to WLPC-CD, to reflect its long-standing status as a Class A station.

On June 9, 2019, WLPC-CD moved from UHF 40 at 2.342 kW of power to UHF 28 (formerly used by now-defunct WCMZ-TV (channel 28) in Flint) at 4 kW of power, improving coverage within Metro Detroit. This was due to the 600 MHz spectrum auction removing channels 38–51 from broadcast television service.

== Subchannels ==
The station's signal is multiplexed:

Subchannels of WLPC-CD
Subchannel	Res.	Short name	Programming
28.1	480i	WLPC	Religious broadcasting
28.2	480i	FYF-TV	Religious "FYF-TV"
28.3	480i	RTN	Religious
28.4	480i	CDTN	Religious "Covenant Daughters Television Network"
28.6	480i	BTV	Family/Religious beacon333tv.com

== See also ==
- Media in Detroit
