= WVTX-CD =

Television station in Bridgeport, Ohio (1998–2017)

- Bridgeport, Ohio; Wheeling, West Virginia; United States
- City: Bridgeport, Ohio
- Channels: Digital: 28 (UHF); Virtual: 28
- Branding: My Ohio Valley; ABC Ohio Valley (28.2)

Ownership
- Owner: OTA Broadcasting, LLC; (OTA Broadcasting (PIT), LLC)
- Operator: Nexstar Media Group

History
- Founded: April 28, 1989
- First air date: December 15, 1998
- Last air date: October 25, 2017
- Former call signs: W28AS (1989–2004); WDBW-CA (January–February 2004); WVTX-CA (2004–2013)
- Former affiliations: Independent (via WBGN-CD, 1998–2004 and 2006–2013); UPN (2004–2006); Fox (via WTRF-DT2, 2013–2014); MyNetworkTV (via WTRF-DT2, 2013–2017); ABC (28.2, via WTRF-DT3, 2013–2017)
- Call sign meaning: West Virginia Transmitter ("TX")

Technical information
- Licensing authority: FCC
- Facility ID: 68408
- Class: CD
- ERP: 15 kW
- HAAT: 137 m (449 ft)
- Transmitter coordinates: 40°3′15.4″N 80°45′33.6″W

Links
- Public license information: Public file; LMS
- Website: Home Page

WVTX-CD (channel 28) was a low-power, Class A television station licensed to Bridgeport, Ohio, United States, serving the Wheeling, West Virginia–Steubenville, Ohio market. WVTX-CD, along with its transmission facilities, were owned by OTA Broadcasting, LLC, a company owned by Michael Dell's MSD Capital, which also owned 11 other Class A television stations. WTRF's owner, Nexstar Media Group, programmed WVTX under a time brokerage agreement.

== History ==
WVTX-CD was originally a translator for independent Pittsburgh station WBGN-LP with the W28AS call sign. The station's call sign changed to WDBW-CA on January 16, 2004, and again to WVTX-CA on February 17, 2004.

Under a local marketing agreement that began in late 2004, Bruno-Goodworth Network retained ownership of WVTX-CA, the station increased power, ceased transmitting WBGN programming, and started its own newscast, produced locally by WVTX Inc., which also shared ownership with cable-only WB affiliate WBWO.

WVTX-CA affiliated with UPN in December 2004 and became the only UPN affiliate serving West Virginia viewers; it produced programming such as a daily 5:30 p.m. newscast and coverage of local church services. WVTX-CA also enjoyed carriage on several area cable systems including Comcast, which carried the station on channel 3.

When UPN and the WB merged to form The CW in September 2006, WVTX-CA lost its network affiliation; the CW affiliation went to WBWO. WVTX Inc. then returned WVTX-CA to the Bruno-Goodworth Network, and the station returned to simulcasting WBGN-LP. The station soon began broadcasting digitally, and assumed its final call sign of WVTX-CD on May 2, 2013. As Wheeling's only independent television station, WVTX-CD aired a mix of local programs and first run syndicated programming. The station was no longer carried on the Comcast system, but remained available over the air.

On September 26, 2013, Bruno-Goodworth Network signed a time brokerage agreement with WTRF-TV (channel 7, then owned by West Virginia Media Holdings). Under the agreement, WVTX-CD's main channel began to carry the Fox and MyNetworkTV programming of WTRF's second subchannel and the ABC programming of WTRF's third subchannel. OTA Broadcasting purchased the Bruno-Goodworth Network and its 11 television stations, including WVTX, on October 10, 2013. Fox programming was dropped September 1, 2014, after WTRF lost the affiliation to WTOV-TV (channel 9). Nexstar Broadcasting Group announced on November 17, 2015, that it would purchase the West Virginia Media Holdings stations, including WTRF-TV, for $130 million; it assumed control of the stations through a time brokerage agreement in December 2015 and completed the acquisition on January 31, 2017.

== Spectrum reallocation ==
In the Federal Communications Commission (FCC)'s incentive auction, WVTX-CD sold its spectrum for $6,100,391; at the time, the station indicated that it would enter into a post-auction channel sharing agreement. WVTX-CD ceased operations October 25, 2017; OTA Broadcasting surrendered its license to the FCC for cancellation on October 26, 2017.

== Subchannels ==
Subchannels of WVTX-CD
Channel	Res.	Short name	Programming
28.1	720p	WTRF-D2	Simulcast of WTRF-DT2
28.2	720p	WTRF-D3	Simulcast of WTRF-DT3
