= KZKC-LD =

KERO-TV translator in Bakersfield, California

Translator of KERO-TV
- Bakersfield, California; United States
- Channels: Digital: 28 (UHF), shared with KDBK-LD; Virtual: 28
- Branding: see KERO-TV

Programming
- Affiliations: 28.1: ABC; 28.2: Court TV

Ownership
- Owner: E. W. Scripps Company; (Scripps Broadcasting Holdings LLC)
- Sister stations: KERO-TV

History
- Founded: October 30, 1995
- First air date: November 23, 1999
- Former call signs: K42EJ (1995–2002); KPMC-LP (2002–2006); KZKC-LP (2006–2020)
- Former channel numbers: Analog: 42 (UHF, 1999–2020)
- Former affiliations: Shop at Home (via KMSG-LP, 1999–2006); Azteca América (2006–2019); Court TV (2019–2020)
- Call sign meaning: Azteca América Kern County (refers to former affiliation)

Technical information
- Licensing authority: FCC
- Facility ID: 65763
- ERP: 15 kW
- HAAT: 1,055.3 m (3,462 ft)
- Transmitter coordinates: 35°27′13.8″N 118°35′40.3″W

Links
- Public license information: LMS
- Website: www.turnto23.com

KZKC-LD (channel 28) is a low-power television station in Bakersfield, California, United States. It is a translator of ABC affiliate KERO-TV (channel 23) which is owned by the E. W. Scripps Company. KZKC-LD's transmitter is located atop Breckenridge Mountain; its parent station maintains studios on 21st Street in Downtown Bakersfield.

== History ==
The station was originally owned by Cocola Broadcasting, where it served as a repeater for Fresno's KMSG-LP (channel 43), an Azteca América affiliate; McGraw-Hill bought it in 2006 and made it a stand-alone station. McGraw-Hill announced on October 3, 2011, that it would sell KZKC-LP, along with its other television stations, to the E. W. Scripps Company as part of its exit from broadcasting. The deal was completed on December 30, 2011. KZKC-LP became an owned-and-operated station of the relaunched Court TV during 2019. Azteca América programming has moved to KBBV-CD (channel 19), and is also available via its national feed on satellite and IPTV providers.

KZKC-LP was converted to digital in 2020 as a translator of KERO-TV, allowing homes with issues receiving KERO-TV's VHF signal or only a UHF antenna to receive KERO-TV in some form.

== Subchannels ==
The station's signal is multiplexed:

Subchannels of KZKC-LD
Channel	Res.	Short name	Programming
28.1	720p	KZKC-HD	Simulcast of KERO-TV / ABC
28.2	720p	CourtTV	Simulcast of KERO-DT2 / Court TV
