= Network affiliate =

Local broadcaster owned by a company other than the owner of the network

A network affiliate (also known by various terms) is a local broadcaster, owned by a company other than the owner of the network, that carries some or all of the lineup of television programs or radio programs of a television or radio network. This distinguishes such a television or radio station from an owned-and-operated station (O&O), which is owned by the parent network.

Notwithstanding this distinction, it is common in informal speech (even for networks or O&Os themselves) to refer to any station, O&O or otherwise, that carries a particular network's programming as an affiliate, or to refer to the status of carrying such programming in a given market as an "affiliation".

== Overview ==
Stations which carry a network's programming by method of affiliation maintain a contractual agreement, which may allow the network to dictate certain requirements that a station must agree to as part of the contract (such as programming clearances, local programming quotas or reverse compensation of a share of a station's retransmission consent revenue to the network). Affiliation contracts normally last between three and five years, though contracts have run for as little as one year or as long as ten; in addition, if a company owns two or more stations affiliated with the same network, affiliation contracts may have end-of-term dates that are the same or differ among that company's affiliates, depending on when a particular station's affiliation agreement was either previously renewed or originally signed.

While many television and radio stations maintain affiliations with the same network for decades, on occasion, there are certain factors that may lead a network to move its programming to another station (such as the owner of a network purchasing a station other than that which the network is already affiliated with, the network choosing to affiliate with another local station in order to improve local viewership of its programming by aligning with a stronger station, or a dispute between a network and station owner while negotiating a contract renewal for a particular station such as those over reverse compensation shares), often at the end of one network's existing contract with a station. One of the most notable and expansive affiliation changes occurred in the United States from September 1994 to September 1996, when television stations in 30 markets changed affiliations (through both direct swaps involving the new and original affiliates, and transactions involving multiple stations) as a result of a May 1994 agreement by New World Communications to switch twelve of its stations to Fox, resulting in various other affiliation transactions including additional groupwide deals (such as those between ABC and the E. W. Scripps Company, and CBS and Westinghouse Broadcasting).

== Network owned-and-operated stations ==
In the United States, Federal Communications Commission (FCC) regulations limit the number of network-owned stations as a percentage of total national market reach. As such, networks tend to have O&Os only in the largest media markets (such as New York City and Los Angeles), and rely on affiliates to carry their programming in other, smaller markets. However, even the largest markets may have network affiliates in lieu of O&Os. For instance, Mission Broadcasting's WPIX serves as the New York City affiliate of The CW (which is 75% owned by station operator Nexstar Media Group, with Warner Bros. Discovery and Paramount Skydance each owning 12.5% stakes), while Paramount owns independent station WLNY-TV in that market. On the other hand, several other television stations in the same market – WABC-TV (ABC), WCBS-TV (CBS), WNBC (NBC), WNJU (Telemundo), WNYW (Fox), WWOR-TV (MyNetworkTV), WPXN-TV (Ion Television), WXTV-DT (Univision) and WFUT-DT (UniMás) – are O&Os.

A similar rule exists in Japan, in which regulations governed by the Ministry of Internal Affairs and Communications limit the number of network-owned commercial television stations as a percentage of total national market reach. As such, commercial networks tend to have O&Os only in the four largest media markets (Kantō, Keihanshin, Chūkyō, and Fukuoka), and rely on affiliates to carry their programming in other prefectures. However, there are two major exceptions to the regulations. NHK is a government-owned, non-commercial television network and, since it is not covered by the ownership cap, owns and operates all of its stations. TXN Network is also not covered by the ownership cap due to the network's low number of affiliates (which are all owned by the network).

In Brazil, since 2024, government regulations limit the number of owned-and-operated stations that a television network can own on a maximum of 20 stations. Before that, this number was limited to just five stations, and as a result, the five main national networks tend to have O&Os only in large metropolitan areas such as São Paulo, Rio de Janeiro and Belo Horizonte, and mainly rely on affiliates to carry their programming to other areas of the country. The metropolitan areas of Recife and Manaus are examples of those who have both O&Os and affiliates. For instance, TV Globo and RedeTV! have O&Os in Recife, but Record, SBT and Band do not. TV Cultura, Rede Brasil and TV Gazeta only have one owned-and-operated station each; those networks are smaller than the five major networks by market reach.

In Canada, the Canadian Radio-Television and Telecommunications Commission (CRTC) has significantly more lenient rules regarding media ownership. As such, most television stations, regardless of market size, are now O&Os of their respective networks, with only a few true affiliates remaining (mainly located in smaller cities). The Canadian Broadcasting Corporation originally relied on a large number of privately owned affiliates to disseminate its radio and television programming. However, since the 1960s, most of the CBC Television affiliates have become network owned-and-operated stations or retransmitters. CBC Radio stations are now entirely O&O.

While network-owned stations will normally carry the full programming schedule of the originating network (save for major local events), an affiliate is independently owned and typically under no obligation to do so. This is especially the case for network shows airing outside the network's primetime hours. Affiliated stations often buy supplementary programming from another source, such as a broadcast syndication service, or another television network which otherwise does not have coverage in the station's broadcast area. Some affiliates may air such programs instead of those from their primary network affiliation; a common example of this was the popular syndicated science fiction drama series Star Trek: The Next Generation (1987–1994). Some network affiliates may also choose to air season games involving local sports teams in lieu of network programming.

== Member stations ==
A handful of networks, including the U.S.-based Public Broadcasting Service (PBS) public television and National Public Radio (NPR), have been founded on a principle which effectively reverses the commercial broadcasting owned-and-operated station model and is called a state network. Instead of television networks owning stations, the stations collectively own the network and brand themselves as "member stations" or "member networks" instead of as affiliates or O&Os.

Individual stations such as WPBS-TV (in Watertown, New York) and KPBS (in San Diego, California) are not allowed to be owned by the Public Broadcasting Service; most belong to local community non-profit groups, universities or local and state educational organizations. The national PBS system is owned collectively by hundreds of broadcasters in communities nationwide. Individual member stations are free to carry large amounts of syndicated programming and many produce their own educational or edutainment content for distribution to other PBS member stations through services like American Public Television or the National Educational Television Association; likewise, most content on PBS's core national programming service is produced by various individual member stations such as WGBH-TV, WNET and WETA-TV. These are not affiliate stations in that the ownership of the main network is not independent of ownership of the individual local stations.

Unlike the modern-day affiliation model with commercial stations, in which network programming is only shared between the main station in a given market and any repeaters it may operate to extend its coverage, PBS is not beholden to exclusive programming agreements with stations in the same metropolitan area. In some markets, the network maintains memberships with two noncommercial educational stations – in some cases, these are owned by the same entity – which split the programming rights. To avoid programming conflicts, the network utilizes a Program Differentiation Plan to assign programming quotas in these situations, resulting in the primary member station carrying more PBS-distributed programming than the secondary member; the number of two-to-a-market PBS members (not counting repeaters of the market's main PBS outlet) has been steadily decreasing since the early 2000s, with few remaining outside larger markets.

The "member station" model had historically been used in Canada in the early days of privately owned networks CTV and TVA, but the original "one station, one vote" model has largely faltered as increasing numbers of stations are acquired by the same owners. In CTV's case, the systematic pattern of acquisition of CTV member stations by the owners of CFTO-TV in Toronto ultimately allowed control over the network as a whole, turning former member stations into CTV O&Os.

== Dual affiliations ==
In some smaller markets in the United States, a station may even be simultaneously listed as an affiliate of two (or in rare cases, three) networks. A station which has a dual affiliation is typically expected to air all or most of both networks' core day time and/or prime time schedules – although programming from a station's secondary affiliation normally airs outside its usual network time slot, and some less popular programs may simply be left off of a station's schedule; this form of dual affiliation was the norm before the digital age. Dual affiliations are most commonly associated with the smaller American television networks, such as The CW and MyNetworkTV, which air fewer hours of prime time programming than the "Big Four" networks and can therefore be more easily combined into a single schedule, although historically the "Big Four" have had some dual-affiliate stations in small markets as well and in some cases, affiliates of more than two networks (including a few that had affiliations with ABC, NBC, CBS and DuMont during the late 1940s through the mid-1950s, when fewer television stations existed in a particular market, especially those that would eventually be able to support four commercial outlets).

Historically, the sole commercial station in a market would commonly take affiliations or secondary affiliations from most or all of the major national networks. As a local monopoly, a station could become a primary affiliate of one of the stronger networks, carrying most of that network's programming while remaining free to "cherry-pick" popular programming from any or all of the rival networks. Similarly, some markets that had two commercial stations shared a secondary affiliation with one network, while maintaining separate primary affiliations (such as in the Ada, Oklahoma-Sherman, Texas market, where until 1985, KTEN and KXII shared secondary affiliations with NBC, while the former was primarily affiliated with ABC and the latter with CBS; the former station is now a primary NBC affiliate).

As U.S.-marketed television receivers have been required to include factory-installed UHF tuners since 1964, the rapid expansion of broadcast television onto UHF channels in the 1970s and 1980s (along with increased deployment of cable and satellite television systems) has significantly reduced the number of one-station markets (limiting them to those with population densities too small to be able to make any additional stations economically viable), providing networks with a larger selection of stations as potential primary affiliates. A new station which could clear one network's entire programming lineup better serves the network's interests than the former pattern of partial access afforded by mixing various secondary affiliations on the schedule of a single local analog channel.

In 2009, after many years of decline, the era of secondary affiliations to multiple major networks (once common in communities where fewer stations existed than networks seeking carriage) finally came to an end at the smallest-market U.S. station, KXGN-TV in Glendive, Montana (which was affiliated with both CBS and NBC). The digital conversion allowed KXGN to carry CBS and NBC programming side-by-side on separate subchannels, essentially becoming a primary affiliate of both networks. This is the most common type of "dual affiliation" existing today in the digital TV age.

In larger markets, multiple full-service channels may be operated by the same broadcaster using broadcast automation, either openly as duopoly or twinstick operations, or through the use of local marketing agreements and shared services agreements to operate a second station nominally owned by another broadcaster. These may be supplemented by LPTV or repeater stations to allow more channels to be added without encountering federally imposed limits on concentration of media ownership. Often, the multiple commonly controlled stations will use the same news and local advertising sales operations, but carry different network feeds.

Further, with the ability of digital television stations to offer a distinct programming stream on a digital subchannel, traditional dual affiliation arrangements in which programming from two networks is combined into a single schedule are becoming more rare. KEYC-TV in Mankato, Minnesota is one such example, carrying CBS programming on its 12.1 subchannel and Fox on 12.2. KEYC's Watertown, New York sister station WWNY-TV follows this same pattern (CBS on 7.1 and Fox on 7.2), but supplements this with a 15kW low-power station broadcasting in high definition on the same transmitter tower under the control of the same owners, using the same studios to provide a second high definition channel for the Fox affiliate.

One notable exception to the survival of secondary affiliations are stations owned by West Virginia Media Holdings. WTRF-DT2 in Wheeling and WVNS-DT2 in Beckley, West Virginia both had Fox as their primary affiliation and MyNetworkTV as a secondary affiliation. Until WTRF lost its Fox affiliation in 2014 to NBC affiliate WTOV-TV (leaving WTRF-DT2 with MyNetworkTV and WVNS as the only one with affiliations from both), each network was carried on the second digital subchannel of WTRF-TV and WVNS-TV, respectively, both of which carry CBS programming on their main signals. Another example is WBKB-TV in Alpena, Michigan, owned by The Marks Group, which also carries CBS programming on its main signal and both Fox and MyNetworkTV on its second digital subchannel. In addition, however, WBKB-TV also has an ABC affiliate on WBKB-DT3, giving the station four different network affiliations between three subchannels.

In Canada, affiliated stations may acquire broadcast rights to programs from a network other than their primary affiliation, but as such an agreement pertains only to a few specific programs, which are chosen individually, they are not normally considered to be affiliated with the second network. CJON-DT in St. John's, Newfoundland, nominally an independent station, uses this model to acquire programming from CTV and the Global Television Network. CJNT-DT in Montreal formerly maintained dual affiliations through both City and Omni Television to satisfy its ethnic programming requirements due to its sale to Rogers Media in 2012. This model eventually ceased as Rogers' was granted a request by the CRTC in late 2012 to change the station's format from a multicultural station to a conventional English-language station, and contribute funding and programming to a new independent multicultural station, CFHD-DT, which signed on in 2013.

This was also done by MyNetworkTV in the 2009–10 season in Des Moines, Iowa and Memphis, Tennessee after it lost their individual affiliates in those markets to other networks as it offered the network's last season of WWE Friday Night Smackdown to the local CW affiliates in both cities without forcing them to carry the remainder of MyNetworkTV's schedule.

From September 1, 2016, to August 31, 2019, the largest current-day market example of a dual affiliation was with Fox Television Stations's WPWR-TV, a Gary, Indiana-licensed station serving the entire Chicago market, which carried a primary affiliation with The CW, while maintaining Fox's MyNetworkTV programming service in a late night timeslot. Beginning on September 1, 2019, The CW affiliation of WPWR-TV was changed to WCIU-TV.

== See also ==
- Owned-and-operated station
- Phantom station
