= List of television stations in West Virginia =

This is a list of broadcast television stations that are licensed in the U.S. state of West Virginia.

== Full-power ==
- Stations are arranged by media market served and channel position.

Full-power television stations in West Virginia
Media market	Station	Channel	Primary affiliation(s)	Notes	Refs
Bluefield–Beckley	WOAY-TV	4	ABC	(Note: Licensed to Oak Hill, West Virginia.)	
Bluefield–Beckley	WVVA	6	NBC, The CW on 6.2		
Bluefield–Beckley	WSWP-TV	9	PBS	(Note: Licensed to Grandview, West Virginia.) (Note: Satellite of WVPB-TV.)	
Bluefield–Beckley	WLFB	40	Religious Independent	(Note: Satellite of WLFG.)	
Bluefield–Beckley	WVNS-TV	59	CBS, Fox and MyNetworkTV on 59.2	(Note: Licensed to Lewisburg, West Virginia.)	
Charleston–Huntington	WSAZ-TV	3	NBC, MyNetworkTV on 3.2		
Charleston–Huntington	WCHS-TV	8	ABC, Fox on 8.2		
Charleston–Huntington	WVAH-TV	11	Catchy Comedy		
Charleston–Huntington	WOWK-TV	13	CBS		
Charleston–Huntington	WLPX-TV	29	Ion Television		
Charleston–Huntington	WVPB-TV	33	PBS		
Clarksburg	WDTV	5	CBS	(Note: Licensed to Weston, West Virginia.)	
Clarksburg	WVFX	10	Fox, The CW on 10.2, CBS on 10.4		
Clarksburg	WBOY-TV	12	NBC, ABC on 12.2		
Clarksburg	WNPB-TV	24	PBS	(Note: Licensed to Morgantown, West Virginia.)	
Parkersburg	WTAP-TV	15	NBC, CBS on 15.2, Fox on 15.3		
Wheeling	WTRF-TV	7	CBS, MyNetworkTV on 7.2, ABC on 7.3		
~Hagerstown, MD	WWPX-TV	60	Ion Television	(Note: Licensed to Martinsburg, West Virginia.)	

== Low-power ==
Low-power television stations in West Virginia
Media market	Station	Channel	Network	Notes	Refs
Bluefield–Beckley	WZTS-LD	16	Cozi TV	(Note: Licensed to Hinton, West Virginia.)	
Bluefield–Beckley	WJDW-LD	35	Religious independent	(Note: Licensed to Tazewell, West Virginia.)	
Charleston–Huntington	WOCW-LD	21	Various		
Charleston–Huntington	W25FX-D	25	[Blank]	(Note: Licensed to Sutton, West Virginia.)	
Charleston–Huntington	W26EW-D	26	HSN		
Charleston–Huntington	WHJC-LP	27	Retro TV	(Note: Licensed to Williamson, West Virginia.)	
Charleston–Huntington	WHWV-LD	45	[Blank]		
Clarksburg	W03BX-D	3	[Blank]		
Clarksburg	W04DZ-D	4	[Blank]		
Clarksburg	WVUX-LD	13	Nostalgia Network	(Note: Licensed to Fairmont, West Virginia.)	
Clarksburg	WUSV-LD	16	Cozi TV		
Clarksburg	W18FB-D	18	[Blank]		
Clarksburg	W24ER-D	21	Cornerstone Television		
Clarksburg	W25FR-D	25	[Blank]		
Clarksburg	W29FK-D	29	Silent		
Parkersburg	WVMY-LD	8	Independent		
Parkersburg	WOVA-CD	22	Fox, The CW on 22.2		
Parkersburg	WIYE-LD	26	CBS, MyNetworkTV on 26.2		
Wheeling	WWVW-LD	56	Silent		

== Translators ==
Television station translators in West Virginia
Media market	Station	Channel	Translating	Notes	Refs
Bluefield–Beckley	WJDG-LD	23	WJDW-LD	(Note: Licensed to Grundy, West Virginia.)	
Charleston–Huntington	W27EF-D	3	WSAZ-TV		
Clarksburg	W28DR-D	9	WSWP-TV	(Note: Licensed to Cedarville, West Virginia.)	
Clarksburg	W20DY-D	20	WVFX	(Note: Licensed to Roanoke, West Virginia.)	
Clarksburg	W16DT-D	24	WNPB-TV	(Note: Licensed to Keyser, West Virginia.)	
Clarksburg	W25FS-D	25	WDTV		
Clarksburg	W28FC-D	28	WDTV		
Clarksburg	W32FY-D	32	WVFX		
Clarksburg	W35DI-D	35	WVFX		
Moorefield	W33EJ-D	3	WHSV-TV		
Moorefield	W24ES-D	5	WTTG		
Moorefield	W29DH-D	6	WJAC-TV		
Moorefield	W27EI-D	9	WUSA		
Moorefield	W22CV-D	24	WNPB-TV		
Parkersburg	W21EA-D	24	WIYE-LD		
Parkersburg	W34FE-D	33	WVPB-TV		
Wheeling	W17EF-D	24	WNPB-TV		
~Hagerstown, MD	W27EE-D	24	WNPB-TV		
~Hagerstown, MD	W21DZ-D	24	WNPB-TV	(Note: Licensed to Romney, West Virginia.)	

== Defunct ==
- WJPB-TV Fairmont (1954–1955)
- WKNA-TV Charleston (1953–1955)

== See also ==
- West Virginia § Media
  - List of newspapers in West Virginia
  - List of radio stations in West Virginia
  - Media of cities in West Virginia: Charleston, Huntington, Wheeling

== Bibliography ==
- "United States TV Stations: West Virginia", Yearbook of Radio and Television, New York: Radio Television Daily, 1964, OCLC 7469377 – via Internet Archive
