= WOVA-CD =

Television station in Parkersburg, West Virginia

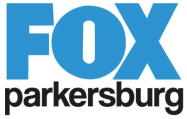

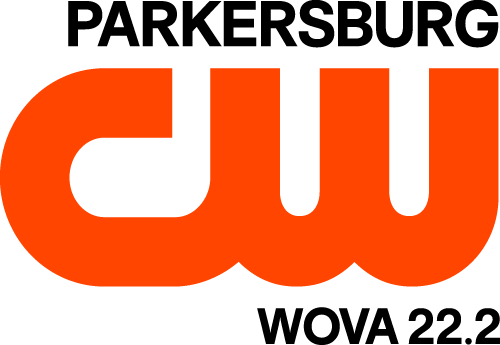
- Parkersburg, West Virginia; Marietta, Ohio; United States
- City: Parkersburg, West Virginia
- Channels: Digital: 20 (UHF); Virtual: 22
- Branding: Fox Parkersburg; Parkersburg CW (22.2)

Programming
- Affiliations: 22.1: Fox; 22.2: CW+

Ownership
- Owner: Gray Media; (Gray Television Licensee, LLC)
- Sister stations: WTAP-TV, WIYE-LD

History
- Founded: May 22, 2002
- First air date: April 10, 2006
- Former call signs: W22CU (2006–2007); WVEX-LP (2007–2012); WOVA-LP (July–October 2012); WOVA-LD (2012–2025)
- Former channel numbers: Analog: 22 (UHF, 2006–2012); Digital: 22 (UHF, 2012–2020)
- Call sign meaning: Ohio Valley

Technical information
- Licensing authority: FCC
- Facility ID: 125125
- Class: CD
- ERP: 15 kW
- HAAT: 189.7 m (622 ft)
- Transmitter coordinates: 39°20′59.8″N 81°33′55.4″W

Links
- Public license information: Public file; LMS
- Website: "Parkersburg CW 15/21" (22.2)

WOVA-CD (channel 22) is a low-power, Class A television station in Parkersburg, West Virginia, United States, affiliated with Fox and The CW Plus. It is owned by Gray Media alongside NBC affiliate WTAP-TV (channel 15) and low-power CBS affiliate WIYE-LD (channel 26). The three stations share studios on Market Street (official address is One Television Plaza) in downtown Parkersburg and transmitter facilities in Warren Township, Ohio.

== History ==
The market's first-ever locally based Fox affiliate was originally seen on a second digital subchannel of WTAP. Prior to that launch, the Parkersburg–Marietta market did not have a Fox affiliate of its own. Cable systems on the West Virginia side of the market piped in WVAH-TV from Charleston, while cable systems on the Ohio side and satellite systems in the region carried WTTE from Columbus; both stations are owned by Cunningham Broadcasting and operated by Sinclair Broadcast Group via local marketing agreements. On April 10, 2006, WTAP launched its Fox-affiliated second digital subchannel to serve as the area's first outlet for the network. To make the new service possible, the big three affiliate underwent a technical transformation. It carved out a new digital, high-definition-ready master control room from space previously used for storage. WTAP also installed an entirely digital production room. Despite the market gaining its own Fox affiliate, WVAH continue to be offered on area cable systems.

WOVA was born out of then-license holder Wood Investments LLC's sale of two low-power station licenses on channel 22 (previously holding the callsign WVEX-LP) and another station on UHF channel 47 (then using the callsign WWVX-LP) to Gray Television on April 10, 2012, for $66,000. Gray filed an application with the Federal Communications Commission (FCC) to change the callsign of WVEX-LP to WOVA-LP on July 18, 2012, and changed its city of license from Marietta to Parkersburg. On September 3, 2012, Fox programming moved to this new low-powered station after which WTAP-DT2 was shut down. The move allowed Fox programming to be broadcast over the air in high definition. On October 1, 2012, the station changed its call sign to WOVA-LD.

On September 1, 2018, a 720p HD feed (branded as "Parkersburg's CW 15/21") of The CW's national CW Plus service was added to subchannel 22.2; prior to September 1, 2018, WQCW from the adjacent Portsmouth, Ohio/Charleston–Huntington, West Virginia media market served as the default CW affiliate in Parkersburg, being offered to viewers through local cable and satellite providers.

== Newscasts ==
The station offers a weeknight prime time news broadcast known as Fox Parkersburg News at 10. Airing for thirty minutes from a secondary set, the show mirrors local news seen on WTAP except for slightly different graphics and unique feature segments.

== Technical information ==
=== Subchannels ===
The station's signal is multiplexed:

Subchannels of WOVA-CD
Channel	Res.	Short name	Programming
22.1	720p	FOX	Fox
22.2	720p	CW+	The CW Plus
