= CBS 47 =

CBS 47 may refer to one of the following television stations in the United States:

== Current ==
- KGPE in Fresno, California
- WJAX-TV in Jacksonville, Florida

== Former ==
- WIYE-LD in Parkersburg, West Virginia (2012–2020)
