= WVDM =

WVDM may refer to:

- WVDM-LD, a low-power television station (channel 21, virtual 40) licensed to serve Quincy, Illinois, United States
- WVBL (FM), a radio station (88.5 FM) licensed to serve Bluefield, West Virginia, United States
