= WTAP-TV =

Television station in Parkersburg, West Virginia

- Parkersburg, West Virginia; Marietta, Ohio; United States
- City: Parkersburg, West Virginia
- Channels: Digital: 35 (UHF); Virtual: 15
- Branding: WTAP; WTAP News

Programming
- Affiliations: 15.1: NBC; 15.2: CBS; 15.3: Fox; for others, see § Subchannels

Ownership
- Owner: Gray Media; (Gray Television Licensee, LLC)
- Sister stations: WOVA-CD; WIYE-LD

History
- First air date: November 11, 1953
- Former call signs: WTAP (1953–1959)
- Former channel numbers: Analog: 15 (UHF, 1953–2009); Digital: 49 (UHF, 2000–2020)
- Former affiliations: DuMont (1953–1956); ABC (secondary, 1953–1970); CBS (secondary, 1953–1970)

Technical information
- Licensing authority: FCC
- Facility ID: 4685
- ERP: 350 kW
- HAAT: 201.6 m (661 ft)
- Transmitter coordinates: 39°20′59.8″N 81°33′55.4″W

Links
- Public license information: Public file; LMS
- Website: www.wtap.com

WTAP-TV (channel 15) is a television station in Parkersburg, West Virginia, United States, affiliated with NBC. It is owned by Gray Media alongside two low-power stations: Fox/CW+ affiliate WOVA-CD (channel 22) and CBS affiliate WIYE-LD (channel 26). The three stations share studios on Market Street (official address is One Television Plaza) in downtown Parkersburg and transmitter facilities in Warren Township, Ohio.

== History ==
The station signed on on Veterans Day 1953. WTAP aired an analog signal on UHF channel 15 and, early in its life, aired programming from all four major networks of the time—NBC, ABC, CBS and DuMont. Then as now it was a primary NBC affiliate. WJPB-TV in Fairmont (channel 35, now sister station WDTV on channel 5) launched four months later and took on exactly the same affiliation. Original plans called for WTAP to join WJPB and turn north-central West Virginia into one giant television market. However, the area is a very rugged dissected plateau and neither station's signal was strong enough to carry across the terrain. Additionally, Parkersburg and Fairmont are 70 miles (113 km) apart. UHF stations have never carried very well across long distances or in rugged terrain.

As a result, WTAP currently remains the only full-power commercial station based in Parkersburg. The only other outlets licensed to the city are the aforementioned low-power Fox and CBS affiliates, and outlying translators of West Virginia Public Broadcasting and the Trinity Broadcasting Network. By the mid-1950s, it was obvious that Clarksburg–Weston–Fairmont and Parkersburg–Marietta were going to be separate markets. However, WTAP retained secondary affiliations with ABC and CBS until 1970, when it became a sole NBC affiliate.

As it was the sole commercial station in town, area cable systems have long piped in stations from outlying markets. Suddenlink's system in Washington County, Ohio (home to Marietta) supplements the area with stations from Columbus, as does the Parkersburg–Marietta DirecTV feed. CAS Cable and Suddenlink's systems in Wood and Pleasants counties in West Virginia supplement coverage with stations from the Huntington–Charleston market.

The station's first studios were on West 7th Street in downtown Parkersburg near Camden-Clark Memorial Hospital. It had a number of owners in its early days including the Zanesville Publishing Company which bailed WTAP out when it almost went off-the-air in the mid-1950s. It held ownership for about a decade until a group of local businessmen bought the station. The station was acquired by Hoffman Estates, Illinois–based Benedek Broadcasting in 1980. The West 7th Street facilities were also home to WTAP radio (1230 AM) until the radio station was spun off and sold to a separate entity. In summer 1990, WTAP-TV moved to its present studios in a former industrial research building. A long-time WTAP on-air personality, Glenn Wilson, suggested and got Parkersburg's approval to rename the last block of Market Street "Television Plaza". As a result, the new building was given "One Television Plaza" as its official mailing address.

After Benedek declared bankruptcy and sold most of its stations in 2002, WTAP was bought by Gray Television. In 2004, it was the first NBC affiliate in West Virginia to offer high definition programming from the network. In late 2005 Gray purchased NBC affiliate WSAZ-TV in Huntington making that station and WTAP sisters. On April 10, 2006, the station launched new second and third digital subchannels to serve as the area's Fox and UPN affiliates, respectively. To make these services possible, WTAP underwent a technical transformation. It carved out two new digital high definition-ready control rooms from space previously used for storage. The station also installed entirely digital production and master control rooms.

After UPN merged with The WB to form The CW in September 2006, WTAP-DT3 transitioned from UPN to Fox's new sister network, MyNetworkTV. WTAP has been digital-only since February 17, 2009. On September 3, 2012, Fox and MyNetworkTV moved to WOVA-LD and WIYE-LD2 respectively, leaving DT2 and DT3 dark. As of 2018, the DT2 and DT3 subchannels returned to the air as simulcasts of WIYE and WOVA.

WTAP is carried on multiple cable systems (in roughly a 50-mile (80 km) radius of Parkersburg) stretching as far east as West Union, West Virginia, as far south as Point Pleasant, West Virginia, as far north as Guernsey County, Ohio, and as far west as Athens, Ohio.

Since the 1990s, WTAP has branded exclusively with its call letters. While this bucks the trend of stations branding with their network and channel number during this time, it is a nod to the very high penetration of cable and satellite, which are all but essential for acceptable television in this market even in the digital era.

== News operation ==
WTAP is one of the strongest NBC affiliates in the United States according to Nielsen ratings. Over the years, its various owners have invested considerable resources in its news operation, resulting in a higher-quality product than conventional wisdom would suggest for what has always been a very small market (it is currently the 193rd market). It airs 4 1/2 hours of news each weekday, a considerable amount for a station in a largely rural area of only 125,000 people. Its newscasts have more viewers than many other television stations in medium to large markets sharing audiences with up to three other affiliates.

After Gray Television bought WSAZ, there were rumors WTAP would scrap its news operation and simulcast newscasts from that station. WSAZ has long been available on cable in Parkersburg and its local newscasts, also among the highest-rated in the country, have always covered Parkersburg. However, Gray itself never considered shuttering WTAP's news department. In addition to WTAP's strong ratings performance, many of WTAP and WSAZ's stablemates are fairly close to each other while operating independently.

At some point in time after adding Fox, WTAP-DT2 began offering a 30-minute prime time newscast. Known as Fox Parkersburg News at 10, the weeknight show mirrors local news seen on the main channel, except for slightly different graphics and unique features. The station became the first outlet in West Virginia to upgrade newscasts to high definition on May 29, 2011. In addition to its main studios, WTAP operates a bureau in Marietta, Ohio.

=== Notable former personalities ===
- Irv Weinstein, director (mid-1950s)

== Subchannels ==
The station's signal is multiplexed:

Subchannels of WTAP-TV
Channel	Res.	Short name	Programming
15.1	1080i	WTAPNBC	NBC
15.2	480i	CBS-SD	CBS (WIYE-LD)
15.3	480i	FOX-SD	Fox (WOVA-CD)
15.4	480i	Weather	Doppler weather radar
15.5	480i	ION	Ion
15.6	480i	WTAPOUT	Outlaw

Simulcast of subchannels of another station

== See also ==
- Channel 15 virtual TV stations in the United States
- Channel 35 digital TV stations in the United States
