= Arlington, West Virginia =

Arlington is the name of several unincorporated communities in the U.S. state of West Virginia.

- Arlington, Harrison County, West Virginia
- Arlington, Upshur County, West Virginia
