= NewsChannel 5 =

NewsChannel 5 may refer to:

- KGWN-TV, Cheyenne, Wyoming
- KRGV-TV, Weslaco, Texas
- KSDK, St. Louis, Missouri
- WDTV, Bridgeport, West Virginia
- WEWS-TV, Cleveland, Ohio
- WPTV-TV, West Palm Beach, Florida
- WPTZ, Plattsburgh, New York
- WTVF, Nashville, Tennessee
