= Channel 3 virtual TV stations in the United States =

The following television stations operate on virtual channel 3 in the United States:

- K02EG-D in Ursine, Nevada
- K02OD-D in Shelter Cove, California
- K03CM-D in Pioche, Nevada
- K03GA-D in Elim, Alaska
- K03GL-D in King Mountain, etc., Alaska
- K03II-D in Manhattan, Kansas
- K03IM-D in Eugene, Oregon
- K03JD-D in Salt Lake City, Utah
- K03JE-D in Victoria, Texas
- K04RS-D in Salinas, California
- K05GJ-D in Thayne, etc., Wyoming
- K07GJ-D in Hoopa, California
- K07QC-D in Driggs, Idaho
- K09ZB-D in Havre, Montana
- K09AAD-D in Sitka, Alaska
- K10AW-D in Challis, Idaho
- K10FC-D in Dodson, Montana
- K11BD-D in Leadore, Idaho
- K11CN-D in Caliente, Nevada
- K11CP-D in Fish Creek, Idaho
- K11GX-D in Whitewater, Montana
- K11LC-D in Prescott, Arizona
- K11WK-D in Stanford, Montana
- K11WQ-D in West Knees, Montana
- K12FB-D in Saco, Montana
- K12OF-D in Bullhead City, Arizona
- K12RE-D in Denton, Montana
- K13GP-D in Malta, Montana
- K13OU-D in Chinook, Montana
- K14NA-D in Globe & Miami, Arizona
- K14ND-D in Overton, Nevada
- K15HY-D in Williams-Ashfork, Arizona
- K15LD-D in Lewistown, Montana
- K16EV-D in Bullhead City, Arizona
- K16LX-D in Juliaetta, Idaho
- K17CL-D in Pahrump, Nevada
- K18JX-D in Hoehne, Colorado
- K18KM-D in Conrad, Montana
- K18LM-D in Mud Canyon, New Mexico
- K19JQ-D in Big Sandy, Montana
- K19JR-D in Wolf Point, Montana
- K20KO-D in Julesburg, Colorado
- K20MC-D in Pahrump, Nevada
- K21IM-D in Fort Sumner, New Mexico
- K21OA-D in Holbrook, Idaho
- K23FV-D in Kingman, Arizona
- K23MV-D in Carlsbad, New Mexico
- K24DT-D in Aberdeen, South Dakota
- K24MB-D in Hobbs, New Mexico
- K24MN-D in Phillips County, Montana
- K25DH-D in Meadview, Arizona
- K25MG-D in Flagstaff, Arizona
- K25NJ-D in Sweetgrass, etc., Montana
- K26MT-D in Paso Robles, California
- K26MV-D in Soldier Canyon, New Mexico
- K27CS-D in Montpelier, Idaho
- K27HM-D in Quanah, Texas
- K27JW-D in Joplin, Montana
- K28OA-D in Cottonwood, Arizona
- K29FD-D in Lake Havasu City, Arizona
- K29FM-D in Artesia, New Mexico
- K29LJ-D in Altus, Oklahoma
- K30HD-D in Tucumcari, New Mexico
- K30QE-D in Panaca, Nevada
- K31GS-D in Roswell, New Mexico
- K31KE-D in San Luis Obispo, etc., California
- K32ME-D in Camp Verde, etc., Arizona
- K32NV-D in Malad City, Iowa
- K33GF-D in Preston, Idaho
- K33MJ-D in Pahrump, Nevada
- K34NF-D in Soda Springs, Idaho
- K35GU-D in Ruidoso, New Mexico
- K41HQ-D in Quanah, Texas
- KATC in Lafayette, Louisiana
- KBME-TV in Bismarck, North Dakota
- KBTX-TV in Bryan, Texas
- KCDO-TV in Sterling, Colorado
- KCNL-LD in Reno, Nevada
- KCRA-TV in Sacramento, California
- KDLH in Duluth, Minnesota
- KDLO-TV in Florence, South Dakota
- KENW in Portales, New Mexico
- KEYT-TV in Santa Barbara, California
- KFDX-TV in Wichita Falls, Texas
- KFTU-DT in Douglas, Arizona
- KGMV in Wailuku, Hawaii
- KIDK in Idaho Falls, Idaho
- KIEM-TV in Eureka, California
- KIII in Corpus Christi, Texas
- KIMT in Mason City, Iowa
- KLEW-TV in Lewiston, Idaho
- KLHP-LD in Dallas, Texas
- KLNE-TV in Lexington, Nebraska
- KMTV-TV in Omaha, Nebraska
- KOAB-TV in Bend, Oregon
- KOET in Eufaula, Oklahoma
- KPWT-LD in Astoria, Oregon
- KREG-TV in Glenwood Springs, Colorado
- KRTV in Great Falls, Montana
- KSAN-TV in San Angelo, Texas
- KSGA-LD in Los Angeles, California
- KSNV in Las Vegas, Nevada
- KSNW in Wichita, Kansas
- KSWK in Lakin, Kansas
- KTBS-TV in Shreveport, Louisiana
- KTOO-TV in Juneau, Alaska
- KTVJ-LD in Nampa, Idaho
- KTVK in Phoenix, Arizona
- KTVO in Kirksville, Missouri
- KYTV in Springfield, Missouri
- KYUS-TV in Miles City, Montana
- KYW-TV in Philadelphia, Pennsylvania
- W03BW-D in Midland City, Alabama
- W03BX-D in Sutton, West Virginia
- W03CA-D in Tallahassee, Florida
- W18EG-D in Onancock, Virginia
- W22FI-D in Key West, Florida
- W23EU-D in Rutland, Vermont
- W27EF-D in Charleston, West Virginia
- W33EJ-D in Moorefield, West Virginia
- WAVE in Louisville, Kentucky
- WBTV in Charlotte, North Carolina
- WCAX-TV in Burlington, Vermont
- WCBI-LD in Starkville, Mississippi
- WCHU-LD in Chicago, Illinois
- WCIA in Champaign, Illinois
- WDVZ-CD in Tuscaloosa, Alabama
- WEAR-TV in Pensacola, Florida
- WEDQ in Tampa, Florida
- WEDU in Tampa, Florida
- WFSB in Hartford, Connecticut
- WHDT-LD in Boston, Massachusetts
- WHNE-LD in Detroit, Michigan
- WHSV-TV in Harrisonburg, Virginia
- WIPM-TV in Mayaguez, Puerto Rico
- WISC-TV in Madison, Wisconsin
- WJMN-TV in Escanaba, Michigan
- WKYC in Cleveland, Ohio
- WLBT in Jackson, Mississippi
- WMDF-LD in Miami, Florida
- WPSU-TV in Clearfield, Pennsylvania
- WRBL in Columbus, Georgia
- WRCB in Chattanooga, Tennessee
- WREG-TV in Memphis, Tennessee
- WSAV-TV in Savannah, Georgia
- WSAZ-TV in Huntington, West Virginia
- WSIL-TV in Harrisburg, Illinois
- WSTM-TV in Syracuse, New York
- WTKR in Norfolk, Virginia
- WWAY in Wilmington, North Carolina
- WWMT in Kalamazoo, Michigan
- WWWB-LD in Clarkrange, Tennessee
- WZNA-LD in Guaynabo, Puerto Rico

The following stations, which are no longer licensed, formerly operated on virtual channel 3:

- K02QM-D in Lemon, etc., Alaska
- K03DI-D in Chelan Butte, Washington
- K03FM-D in Haines, Alaska
- K03GP-D in Sheldon Point, Alaska
- K03HY-D in San Francisco, California
- K03IR-D in Bakersfield, California
- K03IU-D in San Bernardino, California
- K07GD-D in Glenwood Springs, Colorado
- K07ZB-D in Mendenhall Valley, Alaska
- K17CG-D in Ukiah, California
- K25KY-D in Fresno, California
- K48OQ-D in Lowry, South Dakota
- KVTU-LD in Agoura Hills, California
- WBCF-LD in Florence, Alabama
