= WVFX =

Television station in Clarksburg, West Virginia

- Clarksburg–Weston–; Fairmont, West Virginia; United States
- City: Clarksburg, West Virginia
- Channels: Digital: 13 (VHF); Virtual: 10
- Branding: Fox 10; Clarksburg CW 10.2 (on DT2)

Programming
- Affiliations: 10.1: Fox; 10.2: CW+; for others, see § Subchannels

Ownership
- Owner: Gray Media; (Gray Television Licensee, LLC)
- Sister stations: WDTV

History
- First air date: February 8, 1981
- Former call signs: WLYJ (1981–1998)
- Former channel numbers: Analog: 46 (UHF, 1981–2009); Digital: 10 (VHF, 2003–2020)
- Former affiliations: Religious Ind. (1981–1998)
- Call sign meaning: West Virginia's Fox

Technical information
- Licensing authority: FCC
- Facility ID: 10976
- ERP: 110 kW
- HAAT: 212.2 m (696 ft)
- Transmitter coordinates: 39°18′2″N 80°20′36″W

Links
- Public license information: Public file; LMS
- Website: www.wdtv.com

WVFX (channel 10) is a television station licensed to Clarksburg, West Virginia, United States, serving North-Central West Virginia as an affiliate of Fox and The CW Plus. It is owned by Gray Media alongside Weston-licensed CBS affiliate WDTV (channel 5). The two stations share studios on Television Drive in Bridgeport (along I-79/Jennings Randolph Expressway); WVFX's transmitter is located in an unincorporated area between Clarksburg and Arlington.

== History ==
The station signed on February 8, 1981, and aired an analog signal on UHF channel 46. It was a religious independent station using the calls WLYJ (standing for "We Love You Jesus"). Much of the programming consisted of national religious evangelicals and local fund-raising appeals to continue operation of the station. In 1998, WLYJ was sold to Davis Television and converted to a full commercial operation, also becoming the area's first Fox affiliate and changing their call letters to WVFX to match. Prior to WVFX's affiliation with Fox, the network's programming was only available on cable via Pittsburgh affiliate WPGH-TV; as the market's primary NFL team, the Pittsburgh Steelers, only featured two home games on Fox as part of the network's NFC-specific package, the network's priority of affiliating with a station in the market had been low before Withers picked up the affiliation.

Davis Television sold WVFX to Withers Broadcasting in 2007. Since the Clarksburg–Weston–Fairmont market has only five full-power stations, this amount is too few to allow a duopoly under normal Federal Communications Commission (FCC) guidelines, but Withers was able to acquire WVFX under a failed station waiver issued by the FCC, as it was able to demonstrate that due to the market's conditions and channel 46's struggles to remain on the air as WLYJ and under Davis's ownership, that independent ownership was unlikely to turn WVFX around as a going concern. Withers initially maintained WVFX's on West Pike Street/SR 20 in downtown Clarksburg, merging its full operations into the WDTV facility over time. Before the digital transition and the relocation of its transmitter to WDTV's site north of Clarksburg, WVFX struggled with reception over-the-air across the market, since much of the region is a rugged dissected plateau. Most stations in the market depend primarily on multichannel video programming distributors for most of their viewership. After moving to the WDTV transmitter site with the digital transition, it began to use its new VHF channel 10 for its on-air branding, and withdrew all mention of channel 46.

Fairmont is technically the market's largest city because Morgantown (though only 20 miles (32 km) north) has the largest population of any city in the geographic area but it is part of the Pittsburgh market. Locations around Morgantown are within reach of over-the-air signals from Pittsburgh stations. Over time, availability of WPGH-TV has been withdrawn in the market in preference to WVFX due to Fox's 'one to a market' carriage policies in retransmission consent negotiations.

On May 13, 2016, Withers sold WVFX and WDTV to Gray Television for $26.5 million to complete its withdrawal from the television industry. Gray was approved to continue owning WVFX with WDTV under the 2007 failing station waiver originally sought by Withers, and assumed operational control of the stations through a local marketing agreement on June 1. The sale was completed on May 1, 2017.

== Newscast ==
WDTV has carried a 10 p.m. primetime newscast on WVFX-DT1 since late 2010.

== Technical information ==
=== Subchannels ===
The station's digital signal is multiplexed:

Subchannels of WVFX
Channel	Res.	Short name	Programming
10.1	1080i	WVFX-DT	Fox
10.2	1080i	CW	The CW Plus
10.3	480i	StartTV	Start TV
10.4	480i	WVFXCBS	CBS (WDTV) in SD
10.5	480i	Grit	Grit
10.6	480i	Oxygen	Oxygen

Simulcast of subchannels of another station

=== Analog-to-digital conversion ===
WVFX shut down its analog signal, over UHF channel 46, on June 12, 2009, the official date on which full-power television in the United States transitioned from analog to digital broadcasts under federal mandate. The station's digital signal broadcasts on its pre-transition VHF channel 10, and also converted their virtual channel to 10 on the same date to take advantage of that channel number's better branding potential. The station shifted to transmitting on channel 13 in 2020 as a part of the FCC's spectrum reallocation, and continues to use channel 10 as its virtual channel.
