= WIYE-LD =

Television station in Parkersburg, West Virginia

- Parkersburg, West Virginia; Marietta, Ohio; United States
- City: Parkersburg, West Virginia
- Channels: Digital: 26 (UHF); Virtual: 26
- Branding: WIYE 26; My 5/MeTV 26.2

Programming
- Affiliations: 26.1: CBS; 26.2: MeTV/MyNetworkTV; 26.3: MeTV Toons

Ownership
- Owner: Gray Media; (Gray Television Licensee, LLC)
- Sister stations: WTAP-TV; WOVA-CD

History
- Founded: May 22, 2002
- First air date: April 10, 2006
- Former call signs: W64CS (2006–2007); WWVX-LP (2007–2012); WIYE-LP (June–October 2012)
- Former channel numbers: Analog: 64 (UHF, 2006–2012); Digital: 47 (UHF, 2012–2019); Virtual: 47 (2012–2020)
- Former affiliations: UPN (April−September 2006); MyNetworkTV (September 2006–2012)
- Call sign meaning: "IYE" ("eye") (alludes to CBS logo)

Technical information
- Licensing authority: FCC
- Facility ID: 130392
- Class: LD
- ERP: 15 kW
- HAAT: 189.8 m (623 ft)
- Transmitter coordinates: 39°20′59.8″N 81°33′55.4″W

Links
- Public license information: LMS

WIYE-LD (channel 26) is a low-power television station in Parkersburg, West Virginia, United States, affiliated with CBS and MyNetworkTV. It is owned by Gray Media alongside NBC affiliate WTAP-TV (channel 15) and low-power, Class A Fox affiliate WOVA-CD (channel 22). The three stations share studios on Market Street (official address is One Television Plaza) in downtown Parkersburg and transmitter facilities in Warren Township, Ohio.

Although associated with WTAP-TV's news department, there are currently no local newscasts produced exclusively for WIYE-LD and/or any simulcast from the NBC outlet.

== History ==
On April 10, 2012, then-owner Wood Investments LLC announced it was selling WWVX-LP (the station's former callsign) and WVEX-LP (the former callsign of WOVA) to Gray Television for $66,000. Gray changed the callsign of WWVX-LP to WIYE-LP on June 19, 2012, and changed its city of license from Marietta to Parkersburg.

On July 17, 2012, Gray Television signed an affiliation agreement with CBS for WIYE-LP and two other low-powered stations WECP-LD in Panama City, Florida, and WSVF-LD in Harrisonburg, Virginia. As a result, WIYE-LP became the CBS affiliate for the Mid-Ohio Valley on September 3, 2012.

The station, along with WOVA-LD (which took the Fox affiliation from WTAP's second digital subchannel), became the second and third full-time commercial over-the-air network affiliates in the area; WTAP has had the market more or less to itself since it signed on in 1953 (the only other stations in the area being PBS member station WOUB-TV and sister stations WIYE and WOVA). Before channel 47 signed on, WOWK-TV in Huntington had served as the default CBS affiliate for the West Virginia side of the market while WBNS-TV in Columbus served the Ohio side and was carried on the Parkersburg DirecTV feed. On October 1, 2012, the station changed its call sign to WIYE-LD.

== WIYE-LD2 ==
WIYE-LD2 is the dual MeTV/MyNetworkTV-affiliated second digital subchannel of WIYE-LD, broadcasting in 720p High-definition on channel 26.2. It can also be seen on Suddenlink and CAS Cable channel 5 (hence the on-air branding My 5).

Overnight, it aired a live Doppler weather radar feed seen during weather forecasting segments on WTAP's newscasts. It also carries programming from MeTV since 2015, which now takes up the entire schedule outside of MyNetworkTV programming, which currently airs from 1 to 3 a.m. Tuesdays to Saturdays, an increasingly common fate for the service.

On April 10, 2006, WTAP launched a third digital subchannel to serve as the area's first locally based UPN affiliate. To make the service possible, WTAP underwent a technical transformation. It carved out a new digital control rooms from space previously used for storage. The station also installed entirely digital production and master control rooms. After UPN merged with The WB to form The CW in September 2006, WTAP-DT3 transitioned from UPN to Fox's new sister network, MyNetworkTV. On September 3, 2012, the station moved to a new second subchannel of WIYE.

== Subchannels ==
The stations' digital signal is multiplexed:

Subchannels of WIYE-LD
Channel	Res.	Short name	Programming
26.1	1080i	CBS	CBS
26.2	720p	My5	MyNetworkTV & MeTV
26.3	480p		MeTV Toons

== See also ==
- Channel 26 digital TV stations in the United States
- Channel 26 low-power TV stations in the United States
- Channel 26 virtual TV stations in the United States
