= WQCW =

Television station in Portsmouth, Ohio

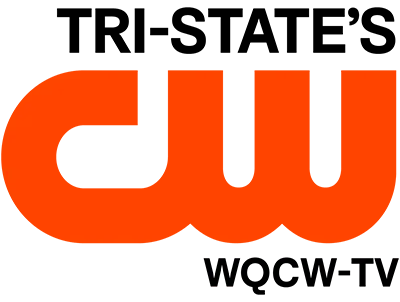
- Portsmouth, Ohio; Charleston–Huntington, West Virginia; United States
- City: Portsmouth, Ohio
- Channels: Digital: 15 (UHF); Virtual: 30
- Branding: Tri-State's CW

Programming
- Affiliations: 30.1: The CW; for others, see § Subchannels

Ownership
- Owner: Gray Media; (Gray Television Licensee, LLC)
- Sister stations: WSAZ-TV

History
- First air date: October 5, 1998
- Former call signs: WHCP (1998–2006)
- Former channel numbers: Analog: 30 (UHF, 1998–2009); Digital: 17 (UHF, 2001–2020)
- Former affiliations: The WB (1998–2006); UPN (secondary, 2000–2006)
- Call sign meaning: "Quality television, The CW"

Technical information
- Licensing authority: FCC
- Facility ID: 65130
- ERP: 1,000 kW
- HAAT: 385.7 m (1,265 ft)
- Transmitter coordinates: 38°30′36.3″N 82°13′9.5″W

Links
- Public license information: Public file; LMS
- Website: www.wsaz.com/page/cw

WQCW (channel 30), branded as Tri-State's CW, is a television station licensed to Portsmouth, Ohio, United States, serving as the CW affiliate for the Charleston–Huntington, West Virginia market. It is one of two commercial television stations in the market licensed outside West Virginia (alongside WTSF, channel 61, in Ashland, Kentucky). WQCW is owned by Gray Media alongside Huntington-licensed NBC affiliate WSAZ-TV (channel 3). The two stations share studios on 5th Avenue in Huntington; WQCW's transmitter is located on Barker Ridge near Milton.

== History ==
Although a construction permit was issued for channel 30 in 1984 under the calls WUXA, no station signed on this channel until October 5, 1998, when WHCP signed on as an affiliate of The WB. It added UPN programming in 2000 after that network was dropped from Fox affiliate WVAH-TV, airing it off-pattern on weekends and after WB network time.

The station's analog transmitter, despite its over 2 million-watt ERP, was not strong enough to cover the entire Huntington–Charleston market, even though it identifies itself on-air as "Portsmouth–Charleston". The market, the largest geographic market east of the Mississippi River, covers 31 counties in central West Virginia, eastern Kentucky and southern Ohio. Most of this territory is a very rugged dissected plateau, making UHF reception difficult. WVAH faced similar problems when it originally signed on in 1982 on channel 23, forcing it to move to channel 11 in 1988. WHCP did not have that recourse, and could not increase their analog station's power due to probable interference with digital television stations in Roanoke, Virginia, and Knoxville, Tennessee. Shortly after going on the air, it signed on two low-power translators—WBWV-LP (channel 69) in Huntington and WOWB-LP (channel 53) in Charleston. The station effectively depended on cable and satellite for most of its viewership, which is all but essential for acceptable television in much of this vast market, even in today's digital era—especially in Eastern Kentucky. Dish Network had carried the station since it began offering a local Huntington–Charleston feed, with DirecTV following suit on January 25, 2006. The station began to be carried in high definition on DirecTV on November 9, 2010, with Dish following on March 7, 2012.

When UPN and The WB shut down and merged to form The CW in 2006, WHCP joined the new network more or less by default. On May 26, WOWB and WBWV became WOCW-LP (channel 21) and WVCW-LP (channel 45), respectively, in preparation for the new affiliation. WHCP followed suit on May 31, changing its calls to WQCW. It initially rebranded itself as "The Q", with a logo showing The CW's logo turning into a capital "Q", but eventually followed the network's generic regional branding style as "Tri-State's CW".

On January 20, 2007, longtime owner Commonwealth Broadcasting sold the station to Lockwood Broadcast Group. The deal closed on May 21, 2007.

The WVCW-LP license was surrendered to the Federal Communications Commission (FCC) on June 1, 2012, as Lockwood did not intend to convert the translator to digital. In the digital transition, WQCW's transmitter was moved to the WOWK tower near Huntington. At the same time, the station's power was boosted to a full million watts, equivalent to five million watts in analog. This gave the station a coverage area comparable to those of the other stations in the market.

On November 15, 2013, Lockwood announced that it would sell WQCW and WOCW-LP to Excalibur Broadcasting for $5.5 million. Had the purchase been approved by the FCC, WQCW would have entered into a shared services agreement (SSA) with Gray Television, owner of NBC affiliate WSAZ-TV. Excalibur's president Don Ray was a former general manager at WSAZ. However, in February 2014, this deal was abandoned in favor of selling WQCW and WOCW to Gray outright for that same $5.5 million; Gray noted in the updated filing with the FCC that WQCW is not among the four highest-rated stations in the market and that there would still be eight unique station owners upon the completion of the WQCW purchase, and in a statement said that "it made more sense to own the stations outright." In the interim, Gray took over WQCW and WOCW through a local marketing agreement on February 1. The sale was completed on April 1.

On January 14, 2015, the low-power repeater WOCW was sold to DTV America Corporation for a token payment of $100; WQCW's move to the WOWK tower made the repeater redundant.

== Newscasts and local programming ==
The station's local programming efforts have been mostly high school sports and local professional wrestling promotions such as the Portsmouth-based Revolutionary Championship Wrestling. Under Lockwood's ownership, the station did not produce much local content, and served mostly as a "pass-through" for automated programming.

The station, under the WHCP call letters, attempted a local news operation between November 7, 2005, and February 21, 2006, with longtime local anchor Tom McGee as the station's main anchor and news director for weeknight shows at 6 p.m. and 10 p.m. The program was done on a very low budget; it did not have teleprompters or an IFB system, and its presentation style was very crude even by small-market standards. The station also did not subscribe to Associated Press newswires. As a result, it never seriously competed with the major stations in the market at 6 p.m., nor WVAH's 10 p.m. show.

McGee was forced from the station on February 21, 2006, over claims the station refused to provide health insurance to his reporters, and because of low revenues allegedly paid some employees with discounted and/or free food from station advertisers, and a dispute over the addition of a news helicopter. The news department was shuttered altogether two days later.

On March 31, 2014, concurrent with Gray's purchase of WQCW, WSAZ-TV moved its 10 p.m. newscast from WSAZ-DT2, its second digital subchannel, to WQCW. The newscast was also expanded from thirty minutes to one hour, putting it in direct competition with the 10 p.m. newscast on WVAH that is produced by ABC affiliate WCHS-TV (channel 8).

== Technical information ==
=== Subchannels ===
The station's signal is multiplexed:

Subchannels of WQCW
Subchannel	Res.	Short name	Programming
30.1	1080i	WQCW	The CW
30.2	480i	H & I	Heroes & Icons
30.3	480i	StartTV	Start TV
30.4	480i	Quest	Quest
30.5	480i	The365	365BLK
3.1	1080i	WSAZ-DT	NBC (WSAZ-TV)

Broadcast on behalf of another station

=== Analog-to-digital conversion ===
WQCW shut down its analog signal, over UHF channel 30, on June 12, 2009, the official date on which full-power television stations in the United States transitioned from analog to digital broadcasts under federal mandate. The station's digital signal remained on its pre-transition UHF channel 17, using virtual channel 30.
