= WSHC =

Radio station at Shepherd University in Shepherdstown, West Virginia

- Shepherdstown, West Virginia; United States
- Broadcast area: Eastern Panhandle of West Virginia; Western Maryland
- Frequency: 89.7 MHz
- Branding: 89.7 WSHC

Programming
- Language: English
- Format: College radio; public radio
- Affiliations: NPR; West Virginia Public Broadcasting

Ownership
- Owner: Shepherd University; (Shepherd College Board of Governors)

History
- First air date: 1974
- Former frequencies: 88.7 MHz (1974–1981); 93.7 MHz (1981–1992)
- Call sign meaning: Shepherd College

Technical information
- Licensing authority: FCC
- Facility ID: 71678
- Class: A
- ERP: 950 watts
- HAAT: −3 meters (−9.8 ft)

Links
- Public license information: Public file; LMS
- Webcast: Listen live
- Website: www.shepherd.edu/communication/wshc-radio/

WSHC (89.7 MHz) is a non-commercial educational college radio station licensed to Shepherdstown, West Virginia, serving the Eastern Panhandle of West Virginia and Western Maryland area. WSHC is owned and operated by Shepherd University and is largely student-programmed. Selected programming from NPR and West Virginia Public Broadcasting in off-hours rounds out its schedule.

== History ==
WSHC is a student-run facility. It is located in the basement of Knutti Hall, on Shepherd University's campus. WSHC also boasts special programming, including Eclectic Weekends (jazz, blues, classics). The station has a 30+ year history of supporting the local music scene.

WSHC became an affiliate of West Virginia Public Broadcasting in 2017, both to alleviate WVEP's coverage issues in the far Eastern Panhandle and to fill time not normally occupied by student programming. The station began carrying WVPB's feed of Morning Edition on weekdays and eight hours of WVPB programming on weekends (6 am–10 am, 8 pm–midnight) effective September 1, 2017. WSHC later added All Things Considered in April 2018.
