= Channel 15 virtual TV stations in the United States =

The following television stations operate on virtual channel 15 in the United States:

- K04GT-D in Bullhead City, Arizona
- K05NL-D in Reno, Nevada
- K06PT-D in Columbia, Missouri
- K06QL-D in Modesto, California
- K13ZL-D in Fresno, California
- K15AA-D in Hugo, Oklahoma
- K15AF-D in Petersburg, Alaska
- K15AP-D in Moose Pass, Alaska
- K15AT-D in Kodiak, Alaska
- K15AU-D in Pilot Station, Alaska
- K15CU-D in Salinas, California
- K15FC-D in Twentynine Palms, California
- K15FJ-D in Lakeport, California
- K15HV-D in Chico, California
- K15IQ-D in Astoria, Oregon
- K15IS-D in Willmar, Minnesota
- K15KC-D in Yakima, Washington
- K15KP-D in St. Louis, Missouri
- K15LS-D in Redwood Falls, Minnesota
- K19KV-D in Prescott, Arizona
- K20OM-D in Beaumont, Texas
- K21NQ-D in Meadview, Arizona
- K22OP-D in Santa Barbara, California
- K23FZ-D in Camp Verde, Arizona
- K24KS-D in Flagstaff, Arizona
- K24NG-D in Lake Havasu City, Arizona
- K24OJ-D in Uvalde, Texas
- K26PI-D in Kansas City, Kansas
- K27DA-D in Big Sandy Valley, Arizona
- K27NT-D in Golden Valley, Arizona
- K29NL-D in Wichita, Kansas
- K30LL-D in Kingman, Arizona
- K30MG-D in Kirksville, Missouri
- K31HY-D in Needles, etc., California
- K31PA-D in Dolan Springs, Arizona
- K33NZ-D in Cottonwood, Arizona
- K35EE-D in Moccasin, Arizona
- KABY-LD in Sioux Falls, South Dakota
- KADN-TV in Lafayette, Louisiana
- KAUO-LD in Amarillo, Texas
- KBWF-LD in Sioux City, Iowa
- KCKA in Centralia, Washington
- KCLO-TV in Rapid City, South Dakota
- KFVD-LD in Porterville, California
- KHPZ-CD in Round Rock, Texas
- KINC in Las Vegas, Nevada
- KIUA-LD in Lincoln, Nebraska
- KLMV-LD in Laredo, Texas
- KMSQ-LD in Mesquite, Nevada
- KNTL-LD in Laughlin, Nevada
- KNXV-TV in Phoenix, Arizona
- KOGG in Wailuku, Hawaii
- KOOG-LD in Bozeman, Montana
- KORX-CD in Walla Walla, Washington
- KORY-CD in Eugene, Oregon
- KPBS in San Diego, California
- KPIF in Pocatello, Idaho
- KPOB-TV in Poplar Bluff, Missouri
- KSMQ-TV in Austin, Minnesota
- KTEL-CD in Albuquerque, New Mexico
- KUNA-LD in Indio, California
- KUPU in Waimanalo, Hawaii
- KUTO-LD in Logan, Utah
- KVHC-LD in Kerrville, Texas
- KVRR in Fargo, North Dakota
- KVVK-CD in Kennewick, etc., Washington
- KVVV-LD in Houston, Texas
- KWJM-LD in Minneapolis, Minnesota
- KXBK-LD in Bismarck, North Dakota
- KXVA in Abilene, Texas
- KXVO in Omaha, Nebraska
- KYOU-TV in Ottumwa, Iowa
- KYUK-LD in Bethel, Alaska
- KYUM-LD in Yuma, Arizona
- W15BU-D in Johnson City, Illinois
- W15DF-D in Houghton Lake, Michigan
- W15DS-D in Bangor, Maine
- W15EO-D in Sebastian, Florida
- W25AA-D in Onancock, Virginia
- W31EG-D in Tampa, Florida
- WANE-TV in Fort Wayne, Indiana
- WBNF-CD in Buffalo, New York
- WBRA-TV in Roanoke, Virginia
- WBTS-CD in Nashua, New Hampshire
- WDSC-TV in New Smyrna Beach, Florida
- WEPT-CD in Peekskill, New York
- WFXW in Greenville, Mississippi
- WGGD-LD in Gainesville, Georgia
- WHDF in Florence, Alabama
- WHPS-CD in Detroit, Michigan
- WHRO-TV in Hampton-Norfolk, Virginia
- WICD in Champaign, Illinois
- WKHD-LD in Mayaguez, Puerto Rico
- WKOP-TV in Knoxville, Tennessee
- WKPC-TV in Louisville, Kentucky
- WMTV in Madison, Wisconsin
- WOLP-CD in Grand Rapids, Michigan
- WPDE-TV in Florence, South Carolina
- WPMI-TV in Mobile, Alabama
- WREP-LD in Martinsville, Indiana
- WSJT-LD in Atlantic City, New Jersey
- WTAP-TV in Parkersburg, West Virginia
- WTFL-LD in Tallahassee, Florida
- WXBU in Lancaster, Pennsylvania
- WXSP-CD in Grand Rapids, Michigan
- WYBM-LD in Westmoreland, New Hampshire
- WYYW-CD in Evansville, Indiana
- WZVC-LD in Athens, Georgia

The following station, which is no longer licensed, formerly operated on virtual channel 15:

- K10RM-D in Kingman, Arizona
- K15IC-D in Weed, California
- K15IL-D in John Day, Oregon
- K15JL-D in Billings, Montana
- KEID-LD in Lufkin, Texas
- KGHZ in Springfield, Missouri
- KUTB-LD in Salt Lake City, Utah
- WBDI-LD in Springfield, Illinois
- WCZA-LD in Marion, Indiana
- WDDZ-LD in Augusta, Georgia
- WLLB-LD in Portland, Maine
- WSFD-LD in Perry, Florida
