= WDTV =

Television station in Weston, West Virginia

- Weston–Clarksburg–; Fairmont, West Virginia; United States
- City: Weston, West Virginia (Note: Originally licensed to Fairmont, moved to Weston in 1960.)
- Channels: Digital: 33 (UHF); Virtual: 5
- Branding: WDTV 5; 5 News

Programming
- Affiliations: 5.1: CBS; for others, see § Subchannels

Ownership
- Owner: Gray Media; (Gray Television Licensee, LLC)
- Sister stations: WVFX

History
- First air date: March 17, 1954
- Former call signs: WJPB-TV (1954–1964)
- Former channel numbers: Analog: 35 (UHF, 1954–1955), 5 (VHF, 1960–2009); Digital: 6 (VHF, 2003–2009), 5 (VHF, 2009–2022)
- Former affiliations: NBC (1954–1955); CBS (secondary, 1954−1955); ABC (secondary 1954–1955 and 1967–1981, primary 1960–1967); Dark (1955–1960); UPN (DT2, c. 2003−2006)
- Call sign meaning: Chosen in honor of KDKA-TV's original call sign

Technical information
- Licensing authority: FCC
- Facility ID: 70592
- ERP: 935 kW
- HAAT: 221.8 m (728 ft)
- Transmitter coordinates: 39°18′2″N 80°20′36″W
- Translator(s): W28FC-D (UHF 28, Roanoke)

Links
- Public license information: Public file; LMS
- Website: www.wdtv.com

WDTV (channel 5) is a television station licensed to Weston, West Virginia, United States, serving as the CBS affiliate for North-Central West Virginia. It is owned by Gray Media alongside Clarksburg-licensed dual Fox/CW+ affiliate WVFX (channel 10). The two stations share studios on Television Drive in Bridgeport (along I-79/Jennings Randolph Expressway); WDTV's transmitter is located in an unincorporated area between Clarksburg and Arlington.

== History ==
It signed on as WJPB-TV on March 17, 1954, as the second television station in the market licensed to Fairmont. WJPB was a primary NBC affiliate but maintained secondary relations with ABC and CBS. WTAP-TV in Parkersburg was technically the area's first outlet having launched October 8, 1953. That station cleared programming from NBC, CBS, and ABC but was intended to be a primary NBC outlet. Originally, there were plans calling for WJPB to join WTAP (located 70 miles [113 km] to the west) and turn North-Central West Virginia into one large market. However, the latter's analog signal on UHF channel 15 was not strong enough to reach across the very rugged dissected plateau to provide Fairmont, Clarksburg, and Weston with adequate reception. Likewise, WJPB's analog signal on UHF channel 35 did not reach Parkersburg.

Those two issues, combined with the fact UHF converters were very expensive, led the station to shut down on February 28, 1955. Meanwhile, the area's third station WBOY-TV signed on from Clarksburg on November 17, 1957. That was originally intended to be the ABC affiliate for all of North-Central West Virginia. After it became clear Clarksburg–Weston–Fairmont and Parkersburg were going to be separate markets, WBOY joined NBC and remains with the network to this day. On December 30, 1959, WJPB's owner was awarded a construction permit for an analog signal on the more desirable VHF channel 5 in Weston. It returned to the air on June 23, 1960, as a sole ABC affiliate. On November 15, 1964, the station changed its call letters to WDTV. The calls had previously been used from 1949 until 1954 on what is now CBS O&O KDKA-TV in Pittsburgh. The call sign was reportedly chosen for use on this West Virginia outlet "in honor" of KDKA which had been a charter affiliate of DuMont and served as the default station for Clarksburg–Weston–Fairmont.

In 1967, WDTV switched primary affiliation to CBS. As a result, it is one of the few TV stations in the country that has held a primary affiliation with all "Big Three" networks. However, for many years it continued sharing ABC with WBOY and aired select sports programming from the network since the market was one of the few in the country without a primary ABC affiliate. The area's cable companies imported WTAE-TV from Pittsburgh (which already served the Morgantown area) to bring the full ABC schedule to the area. Illinois businessman W. Russell Withers bought the station in 1973 under his Withers Broadcasting

At some point in 1981, WDTV dropped all ABC programming. The network would not return to a Clarksburg–Weston–Fairmont based station until August 1, 2008, when WBOY launched a new second digital subchannel to offer the network. WDTV aired programming from UPN on its second digital subchannel until September 18, 2006, when the network merged with The WB to form The CW. WVFX, at the time owned separately from this station, became an affiliate with the new combined service (through The CW Plus) on a second digital subchannel.

In 2007, WVFX's owner, Davis Television, sold that station to Withers Broadcasting. The Clarksburg–Weston–Fairmont market has only five full-power stations, too few to allow a duopoly under normal Federal Communications Commission (FCC) guidelines. However, Withers obtained a "failed station" waiver allowing the purchase to go through. Gray Television announced on May 13, 2016, that it would acquire WDTV and WVFX for $26.5 million. Gray assumed control of the stations through a local marketing agreement on June 1. The sale was completed on May 1, 2017.

The northern West Virginia television geography is unusual, as Monongalia County (including Morgantown) and Preston County are assigned to the Pittsburgh market. WDTV has long claimed Morgantown as its primary coverage area, and been carried on Xfinity's Morgantown cable system and its predecessors since 1965. However, none of the Clarksburg–Weston–Fairmont market stations were available on satellite in those counties, as the FCC would not allow satellite providers to carry them. A change in the law removed this restriction; one of the stated goals was to allow "orphan counties" served on satellite only by stations from other states to receive stations from their own state. The Monongalia and Preston County governments petitioned to allow carriage of Clarksburg–Weston–Fairmont market stations, and the market change was granted on February 2, 2018.

== News operation ==
WBOY historically leads WDTV in local Nielsen ratings because it operates a news bureau in Morgantown and provides its two West Virginia sister stations with a large amount of sports content relative to West Virginia University, an arrangement dating back to their ownership by West Virginia Media Holdings. However, in recent years, WDTV has been able to pull ahead in the key demographics for most of their shows, and even beats WBOY in overall viewers at times. In summer 2005, its newscast operation and commercial production went completely digital using electronic news gathering cameras. The station was also first in West Virginia (and quite possibly the East Coast) to exchange audio and video files through various compression formats and high speed FTP servers.

After acquiring WVFX, WDTV made plans to produce a prime time newscast at 10 p.m. on the former. It would be the second time a broadcast has been attempted on the station in its history. In late 2010, the plans became a reality. The show is known as Fox 10 News at 10 and it features the Fox Interactive Media graphics package and music theme. WVFX also simulcasts WDTV's early evening broadcasts on weeknights from 5 to 6:30 p.m. This station does not air its weekday morning show for a full two hours unlike most CBS affiliates.

On November 12, 2011, WDTV began airing their news broadcasts in high definition. It makes WDTV the third station in West Virginia to broadcast local news in high definition, following WTAP and WSAZ-TV (which, ironically, are now sister stations of WDTV).

=== 4th and Forever: Liberty's Last Season ===
On December 5, 2024, WDTV aired the station's first-ever documentary, 4th and Forever: Liberty's Last Season. Narrated by Jimbo Fisher, a 1983 graduate of Liberty High School, the documentary follows the school's last football season before being consolidated into its crosstown rival. This is the first full-length documentary produced by a television station in Clarksburg, West Virginia.

=== Notable former on-air staff ===
- Susan Barnett
- Molly Line
- Christi Paul
- Dan Potash

== Technical information ==
=== Subchannels ===
The station's signal is multiplexed:

Subchannels of WDTV
Channel	Res.	Short name	Programming
5.1	1080i	WDTV-D1	CBS
5.2	1080i	MeTV-D2	MeTV
5.3	480i	WDTV-D3	Heroes & Icons
5.4	480i	Outlaw	Outlaw

=== Analog-to-digital conversion ===
WDTV shut down its analog signal, over VHF channel 5, on June 12, 2009, the official date on which full-power television stations in the United States transitioned from analog to digital broadcasts under federal mandate. The station's digital signal relocated from its pre-transition VHF channel 6 to channel 5.

== Out-of-market carriage ==
WDTV is carried as far south as Summersville in the Charleston–Huntington market. In the Pittsburgh market, it is carried in Morgantown, West Virginia; Markleysburg, Pennsylvania; and Oakland, Maryland. In the Harrisonburg market, it is carried in Franklin, Pendleton County.

=== CATV ===
During the 1970s and possibly into the 1980s, WDTV was once carried in Charleston and surrounding areas. In Charleston, WDTV was available only when WCHS-TV, then the CBS affiliate in the Charleston–Huntington market, did not clear a network program.
