= WVAH-TV =

Television station in Charleston, West Virginia

- Charleston–Huntington, West Virginia; United States
- City: Charleston, West Virginia
- Channels: Digital: 24 (UHF); Virtual: 11

Programming
- Affiliations: 11.1: Roar; for others, see § Subchannels

Ownership
- Owner: Cunningham Broadcasting; (WVAH Licensee, LLC)
- Operator: Sinclair Broadcast Group
- Sister stations: WCHS-TV

History
- Founded: October 14, 1981
- First air date: September 19, 1982
- Former channel numbers: Analog: 23 (UHF, 1982–1988), 11 (VHF, 1988–2009); Digital: 19 (UHF, 2001–2019)
- Former affiliations: Independent (1982–1986); Fox (1986–2021); UPN (secondary, 1995–2000); Catchy Comedy (2021–2026, now on 11.5)
- Call sign meaning: West Virginia, Almost Heaven (lyrics from John Denver's "Take Me Home, Country Roads", one of four official state songs, and Division of Tourism slogan)

Technical information
- Licensing authority: FCC
- Facility ID: 417
- ERP: 533 kW
- HAAT: 514.1 m (1,687 ft)
- Transmitter coordinates: 38°24′28″N 81°54′12″W

Links
- Public license information: Public file; LMS

WVAH-TV (channel 11) is a television station licensed to Charleston, West Virginia, United States, serving the Charleston–Huntington market as an affiliate of the digital multicast network Roar. It is owned by Cunningham Broadcasting and operated by Sinclair Broadcast Group alongside ABC/Fox affiliate WCHS-TV (channel 8). The two stations share studios on Piedmont Road in Charleston; WVAH-TV's transmitter is located atop Coal Mountain, south of Scott Depot, West Virginia.

== History ==
=== Debut on channel 23 ===
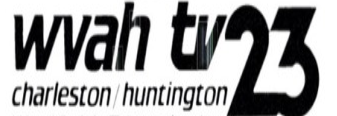
Original logo of WVAH, when the station was on channel 23

The station began airing an analog signal on UHF channel 23 on September 19, 1982, with an Elvis Presley movie marathon. It was owned by the newly created Meridian Communications based out of Pittsburgh, which won the license after the West Virginia Legislature forced West Virginia Public Broadcasting to withdraw its own application for the channel. It was the first independent station in West Virginia, as well as the first new commercial station in the market since what is now WOWK-TV (channel 13) signed-on in 1955, and the first commercial UHF station in the state since WKNA-TV in Charleston went off-the-air in 1955. Studios were located on Mount Vernon Road in Teays Valley, an unincorporated area halfway between Huntington and Charleston, though its mailing address said Hurricane (the two areas share a ZIP code). It became a charter Fox affiliate on October 9, 1986. Act III Broadcasting bought the station in 1987, along with WRGT-TV in Dayton, Ohio, from Meridian Communications, in a two-station group deal.

=== Move to channel 11 ===
Soon after buying control, Act III applied to move the station to the VHF band. Despite broadcasting from a 1,500-foot (457 m) tower with the maximum five million watts of power, WVAH had considerable difficulty penetrating the market. The Charleston–Huntington market covers 61 counties in Central West Virginia, Eastern Kentucky, and Southern Ohio. Most of this area is a very rugged dissected plateau, and as a result, UHF stations usually do not get good reception in this kind of terrain. Some areas of the market were among the few where cable television still wasn't available. As a result, WVAH was permitted to switch to VHF channel 11 on April 11, 1988, barely two years after Fox's launch. This marked the first time that any station in the United States signed off as a UHF station, and return to the air as a VHF station. However, the station was short-spaced to WPXI in Pittsburgh and WJHL-TV in Johnson City, Tennessee. It then had to conform its signal to protect WJHL. As a result, it did not provide a clear over-the-air signal to the southwestern part of the market.

On January 16, 1995, WVAH began airing UPN programming during overnight hours. However, the station could not clear the entire schedule and dropped the network in early 2000.

Act III merged with Abry Broadcast Partners in 1995, with the company's stations coming under the Sullivan Broadcasting banner. In 1998, Sullivan merged with Sinclair Broadcast Group. A year earlier, Sinclair had purchased the broadcasting properties of Heritage Media, which included WCHS (the remainder of Heritage Media went to News Corporation). It could not keep both WCHS and WVAH due to Federal Communications Commission (FCC) rules in effect at the time forbidding duopolies. Sinclair opted to keep the longer-established WCHS and sold WVAH to Glencairn, Ltd. which was headed by former Sinclair executive Edwin Edwards. However, nearly all of Glencairn's stock was held by the Smith family, owners, and founders of Sinclair. In effect, Sinclair still owned WVAH. Sinclair further circumvented the rules by signing a local marketing agreement with Glencairn that allowed it to continue operating WVAH. While WVAH retained its own studios in Teays Valley, most of its operations were merged into WCHS' studios in Charleston.

Last logo of WVAH as a Fox affiliate

In 2001, Sinclair tried to acquire Glencairn outright, but the FCC did not allow Sinclair to re-acquire WVAH because it does not allow common ownership of two of the four highest-rated stations in a single market. As a result, Glencairn kept WVAH and changed its name to Cunningham Broadcasting. However, nearly all of Cunningham's stock is controlled by trusts in the name of the Smith family. There is virtually irrefutable evidence that Cunningham is a shell corporation that Sinclair operates to circumvent FCC ownership limits.

Following a tower collapse on February 19, 2003, WVAH moved its transmitter and almost all of its facilities to WCHS' studios in Charleston. However, its main studios remained in Teays Valley until late 2009.

On May 15, 2012, Sinclair and Fox agreed to a five-year extension to the network's affiliation agreement with Sinclair's 19 Fox stations, including WVAH-TV, allowing them to continue carrying the network's programming until 2017.

=== Losing Fox ===
On February 1, 2021, Sinclair moved its Fox affiliation to sister station WCHS-TV on channel 8.2, although it still markets the signal as "Fox 11". Sinclair did so in several markets to consolidate its affiliations onto stations owned directly by Sinclair rather than with its sidecar divisions. The station began to carry programming from Weigel Broadcasting's Decades network (now known as Catchy Comedy).

=== Carriage dispute ===
In summer 2006, Charter Communications streamlined its operations which included selling off portions of its cable system which were "geographically non-strategic". Charter accounts in the Charleston–Huntington area were purchased by Suddenlink Communications (formerly known as Cebridge). Sinclair requested a $40 million one time fee and a $1 per sub per month fee from Suddenlink for retransmission rights of WVAH and WCHS on the Suddenlink cable system. This led to a protracted media battle and smear campaign between the two companies and Sinclair pulled the two stations from Suddenlink's lineup in the Beckley market. After several weeks of negotiations, the two companies reached an agreement allowing WVAH and WCHS to continue transmission over the Suddenlink cable system. The terms of the agreement were not released to the public.

== Newscasts ==
As a Fox affiliate, WVAH had aired newscasts produced by sister station WCHS under the Eyewitness News branding. This included Eyewitness News This Morning on Fox 11, which was seen weekday mornings from 6 to 8 a.m., along with a 6:30 p.m. half-hour newscast weeknights, and an hour-long 10 p.m. newscast every night until the Fox affiliation moved to WCHS-DT2 in February 2021.

=== Transition to local HD ===
WCHS and WVAH started the switch over to high definition in June 2012 by first installing a new HD Master Control room. In July 2012, the station started to remove the set from the studio that was installed in the late 1990s. The old news desk, backdrop, monitors, and the chroma key wall were moved to a small conference room in the station until the transition to HD news was completed. In late July 2012, the new set arrived from Devlin Design Group based out of Crested Butte, Colorado. During the months of August and September, the new set was installed. On September 29, 2012, WCHS and WVAH became the third and fourth stations in the market to launch high definition newscasts.

== Technical information ==
=== Subchannels ===
The station's signal is multiplexed:

Subchannels of WVAH-TV
Subchannel	Res.	Short name	Programming
11.1	480i	WVAH-TV	Roar
11.2	480i	TheNest	The Nest
11.3	480i	Comet	Comet
11.4	480i	Charge!	Charge!
11.5	480i	Catchy	Catchy Comedy
3.2	480i	MyZ	MeTV/MyNetworkTV (WSAZ-TV)
3.3	480i	Outlaw	Outlaw (WSAZ-TV)

Broadcast on behalf of another station

=== Analog-to-digital conversion ===
WVAH-TV ended regular programming on its analog signal, over VHF channel 11, on February 17, 2009, the original target date on which full-power television stations in the United States were to transition from analog to digital broadcasts under federal mandate (which was later pushed back to June 12, 2009). The station's digital signal remained on its pre-transition UHF channel 19, using virtual channel 11.

As part of the SAFER Act, WVAH-TV kept its analog signal on the air until June 26 to inform viewers of the digital television transition through a loop of public service announcements from the National Association of Broadcasters.

== See also ==
- Channel 11 virtual TV stations in the United States
- Channel 24 digital TV stations in the United States
