= Grandview, Raleigh County, West Virginia =

Grandview
- Unincorporated community
- Location within the state of West Virginia Grandview (the United States)
- Coordinates: 37°49′30″N 81°4′7″W
- Country: United States
- State: West Virginia
- County: Raleigh
- Elevation: 2,484 ft (757 m)
- Time zone: UTC-5 (Eastern (EST))
  - Summer (DST): UTC-4 (EDT)
- GNIS ID: 1539572

Grandview is an unincorporated community in Raleigh County, West Virginia, United States.

The community was so named on account of its elevated town site.
