= WCHS-TV =

Television station in Charleston, West Virginia

- Charleston–Huntington, West Virginia; United States
- City: Charleston, West Virginia
- Channels: Digital: 29 (UHF); Virtual: 8
- Branding: ABC 8; Your News on 8; Fox Appalachia (8.2)

Programming
- Affiliations: 8.1: ABC; 8.2: Fox; 8.3: Antenna TV

Ownership
- Owner: Sinclair Broadcast Group; (WCHS Licensee, LLC)
- Sister stations: WVAH-TV

History
- First air date: August 15, 1954
- Former channel numbers: Analog: 8 (VHF, 1954–2009); Digital: 41 (UHF, 2001–2018)
- Former affiliations: CBS (1954–1958, 1962–1986); ABC (1958–1962); NTA (secondary, 1956–1961)
- Call sign meaning: From WCHS radio; Charleston

Technical information
- Licensing authority: FCC
- Facility ID: 71280
- ERP: 533 kW
- HAAT: 514.1 m (1,687 ft)
- Transmitter coordinates: 38°24′28″N 81°54′12″W

Links
- Public license information: Public file; LMS
- Website: wchstv.com

WCHS-TV (channel 8) is a television station licensed to Charleston, West Virginia, United States, serving the Charleston–Huntington market as an affiliate of ABC and Fox. It is owned by Sinclair Broadcast Group, which provides certain services to WVAH-TV (channel 11) under a local marketing agreement (LMA) with Cunningham Broadcasting. However, Sinclair effectively owns WVAH-TV as the majority of Cunningham's stock is owned by the family of deceased group founder Julian Smith. The two stations share studios on Piedmont Road in Charleston; WCHS-TV's transmitter is located atop Coal Mountain, south of Scott Depot, West Virginia.

== History ==
WCHS-TV signed-on August 15, 1954, and was originally owned by the Tierney Company, alongside WCHS radio (580 AM). WCHS-TV was the second station in Charleston after WKNA-TV, which launched on UHF channel 49 as an ABC affiliate in 1953 but went dark in 1955 due to lack of viewership. Originally a CBS station sharing ABC with WSAZ-TV (channel 3), channel 8 became a full CBS affiliate when WHTN-TV in Huntington signed-on in 1955. During the late-1950s, it was also briefly affiliated with the NTA Film Network.

In 1958, WCHS-TV swapped affiliations with WHTN and became an ABC affiliate. The WCHS stations were sold to Rollins Telecasting in 1960. The station reversed the swap and went back to CBS in 1962. For reasons that remain unknown, WCHS did not carry the CBS Evening News for several years after returning to CBS. On June 1, 1986, the station swapped affiliations once again with channel 13, now known as WOWK-TV.

In 1987, Rollins Telecasting merged with Heritage Broadcasting to form Heritage Media. In December 1987, the station relocated from its longtime studios on Virginia Street East to their current location on Piedmont Road in Charleston. The company sold off WCHS radio in 1991. Heritage sold all of its remaining broadcasting properties (four television stations, LMAs for two other television stations, and 24 radio stations) to Sinclair Broadcast Group in 1997 just as Heritage itself was being swallowed up by News Corporation (that sale being for Heritage's supermarket marketing operations, rather than for its television stations). None of Heritage's stations thus switched network affiliations.

Shortly afterwards, in 1998, Sinclair bought out Sullivan Broadcasting, owners of WVAH-TV; as the Federal Communications Commission (FCC) did not permit duopolies at the time, WVAH's license assets were transferred to Glencairn. However, Glencairn's stock was almost entirely controlled by the Smith family, owners and founders of Sinclair. In effect, Sinclair now owned both stations. The company further circumvented the rules by entering into a local marketing agreement with WVAH, with WCHS as senior partner. The other station retained its own studios on Mount Vernon Road in Hurricane along I-64 even although most of its operations were merged with WCHS. Eventually, WVAH's separate facilities were put up for sale.

Sinclair tried to merge with Glencairn in 2001 after the FCC decided to allow duopolies but could not purchase WVAH because the FCC does not allow common ownership of two of the four highest-rated stations in a single market. Glencairn changed its name to Cunningham Broadcasting and the local marketing agreement with WCHS continues to this day. There is overwhelming evidence that Glencairn/Cunningham is merely a shell corporation used by Sinclair to circumvent FCC ownership rules.

On February 1, 2021, Sinclair moved the Fox network affiliation from WVAH-TV to WCHS-DT2, although for a time it still marketed the signal as "Fox 11" and more formally as "Fox 11, WCHS 8.2". The move followed similar moves of Fox affiliations from Sinclair-managed stations owned by third parties (including, but not limited to, Cunningham Broadcasting) at the beginning of 2021 to subchannels of sister stations owned by Sinclair in the Cedar Rapids, Iowa; Columbus, Ohio; and Dayton, Ohio, markets. By 2026, the Fox subchannel had been rebranded as "Fox Appalachia".

== News operation ==
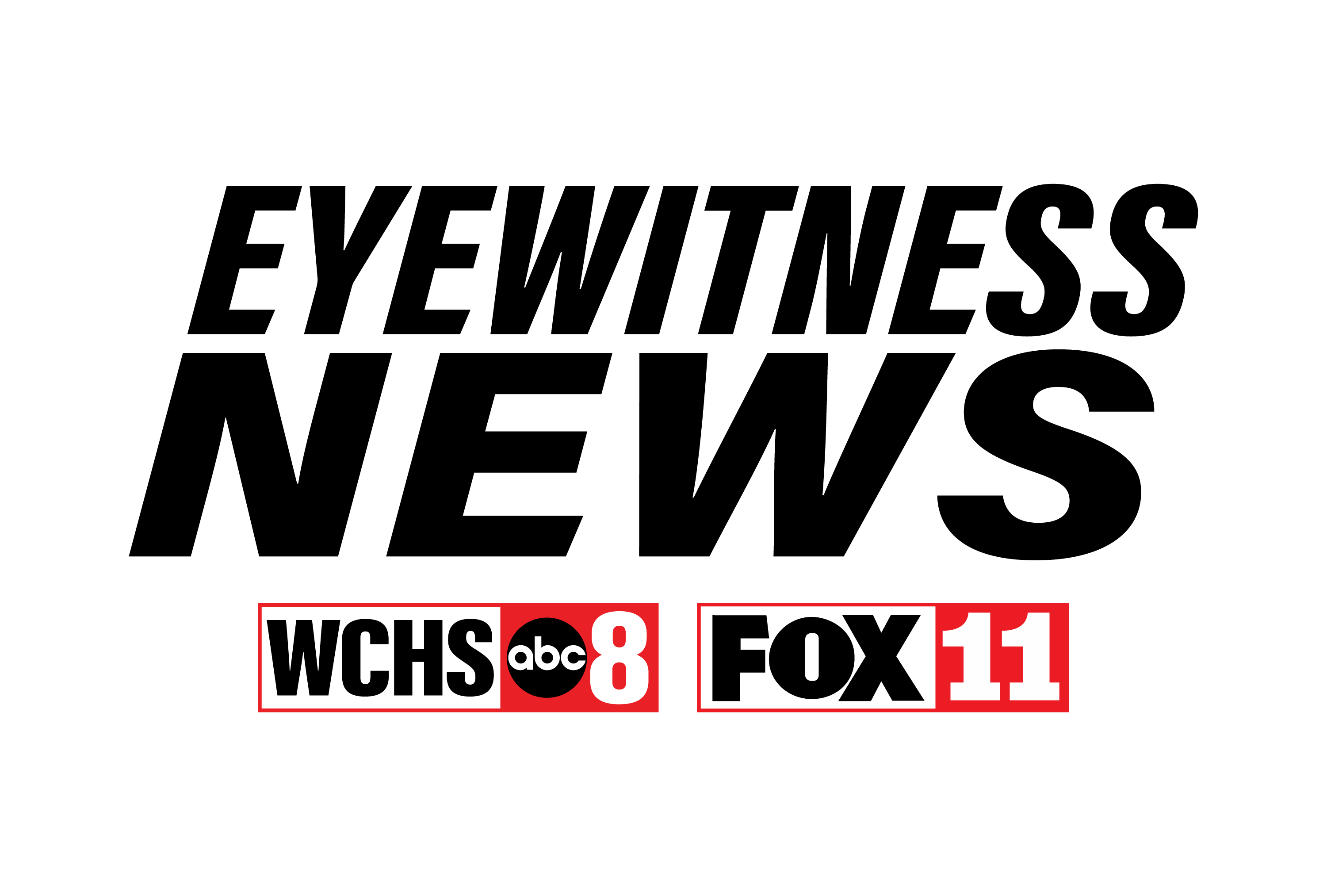
WCHS Eyewitness News Logo

For most of its history according to Nielsen ratings, WCHS has been a distant runner up to longtime dominant WSAZ-TV. This station and WOWK are usually more competitive in Charleston but WCHS ultimately has higher viewership, however neither is competitive in Huntington, or in the counties of Ohio and Kentucky that are in the market. This is because both stations generally ignore news outside of Charleston. In 2013, however, WCHS opened a small studio and news office in Huntington. WSAZ came in a close second to WCHS for a short period in late 2009–early 2010. This was due to lower lead-in numbers originated by The Jay Leno Show and WSAZ has since regained its first place ratings.

WCHS currently uses the Eyewitness News branding for its news operation and produces three newscasts for WCHS-DT2. This includes Eyewitness News This Morning on Fox 11 seen for an hour on weekday mornings from 7 until 8. There is also an hour-long nightly prime time broadcast known as Eyewitness News at 10 on Fox 11. For many years, WVAH's 10 p.m. news broadcast was the market's only hour-long late evening newscast. This changed on March 31, 2014, when WSAZ moved their 10 p.m. newscast from MyNetworkTV affiliate WSAZ-DT2 to CW affiliate WQCW (channel 30) and expanded the broadcast from a half-hour to a full hour.

=== Transition to local HD ===
WCHS and WVAH started the switch over to high definition in June 2012 by first installing a new HD Master Control room. In July 2012, the station started to remove the set from the studio that was installed in the late '90s. The old news desk, backdrop, monitors, and the chroma key wall were moved to a small conference room in the station until the transition to HD news was completed. In late July 2012, the new set arrived from Devlin Design Group based out of Crested Butte, Colorado. During the months of August and September, the new set was installed. On September 29, 2012, WCHS and WVAH became the third and fourth stations in the market to launch high definition newscasts.

== Technical information ==
=== Subchannels ===
The station's digital signal is multiplexed:

Subchannels of WCHS-TV
Subchannel	Res.	Short name	Programming
8.1	720p	WCHS8	ABC
8.2	720p	FOX11	Fox
8.3	480i	Antenna	Antenna TV
3.5	480i	Justice	True Crime Network (WSAZ-TV)

Broadcast on behalf of another station

For a period of time it carried a service called TheCoolTV on 8.2, but like all other Sinclair stations, it dropped this without announcement on August 31, 2012.

=== Analog-to-digital conversion ===
WCHS-TV ended regular programming on its analog signal, over VHF channel 8, on June 12, 2009, the official date on which full-power television stations in the United States transitioned from analog to digital broadcasts under federal mandate. The station's digital signal remained on its pre-transition UHF channel 41, using virtual channel 8.

== Carriage disputes ==
=== Dish Network ===
Sinclair and Dish Network were both in a brief dispute over retransmission fees on May 17, 2005. This dispute was resolved on May 20 and the notice was taken down.

=== Suddenlink Communications ===
In summer 2006, Charter Communications streamlined its operations which included selling off portions of its cable system which were "geographically non-strategic". Charter accounts in the Charleston–Huntington area were purchased by Suddenlink Communications (formerly known as Cebridge). Sinclair requested a $40 million one time fee and a $1 per sub per month fee from Suddenlink for retransmission rights of WVAH and WCHS on the Suddenlink cable system. This led to a protracted media battle and smear campaign between the two companies and Sinclair pulled the two stations from Suddenlink's lineup in the Beckley market. After several weeks of negotiations, the two companies reached an agreement allowing WVAH and WCHS to continue transmission over the Suddenlink cable system. The terms of the agreement were not released to the public.

=== Time Warner Cable ===
It was announced on December 20, 2006, that Time Warner Cable systems in the Charleston–Huntington market would lose WCHS and WVAH starting December 31. However, this only applied to cable subscribers that were previously owned by Adelphia. An extension agreement was made until January 12, 2007, for negotiations.
