= WSAZ-TV =

Television station in Huntington, West Virginia

ATSC 3.0 station
- Huntington–Charleston, West Virginia; United States
- City: Huntington, West Virginia
- Channels: Digital: 22 (UHF); Virtual: 3
- Branding: WSAZ 3, WSAZ NewsChannel 3; MeTV Charleston–Huntington (3.2)

Programming
- Affiliations: 3.1: NBC; 3.2: MeTV/MyNetworkTV; for others, see § Subchannels

Ownership
- Owner: Gray Media; (Gray Television Licensee, LLC)
- Sister stations: WQCW

History
- First air date: November 15, 1949
- Former channel numbers: Analog: 5 (VHF, 1949–1952), 3 (VHF, 1952–2009); Digital: 23 (UHF, 2002–2020)
- Former affiliations: All secondary: CBS (1949–1954); ABC (1949–1955); DuMont (1949–1956)
- Call sign meaning: derived from former radio sister, now WRVC

Technical information
- Licensing authority: FCC
- Facility ID: 36912
- ERP: 800 kW
- HAAT: 385.7 m (1,265 ft)
- Transmitter coordinates: 38°30′36.3″N 82°13′9.5″W
- Translator(s): W27EF-D Charleston

Links
- Public license information: Public file; LMS
- Website: www.wsaz.com

WSAZ-TV (channel 3) is a television station licensed to Huntington, West Virginia, United States, affiliated with NBC. It serves the Charleston–Huntington market, the second-largest television market (in terms of geographical area) east of the Mississippi River; the station's coverage area includes 31 counties in central West Virginia, eastern Kentucky and southeastern Ohio. WSAZ-TV is owned by Gray Media alongside Portsmouth, Ohio–licensed CW affiliate WQCW (channel 30). The two stations share studios on 5th Avenue in Huntington, with an additional studio and newsroom on Columbia Avenue in Charleston. WSAZ-TV's transmitter is located on Barker Ridge near Milton, West Virginia.

== History ==
=== Early years ===
The first and oldest television station in West Virginia, WSAZ-TV, began broadcasting November 15, 1949, on VHF channel 5. The station was originally owned by the Huntington Publishing Company along with the Huntington Herald-Dispatch and WSAZ radio (930 AM, now WRVC), and carried programming from all four networks at the time (NBC, CBS, ABC, and DuMont). However, it was a primary NBC affiliate due to WSAZ radio's long affiliation with NBC Radio. When WCHS-TV (channel 8) signed on from Charleston in 1954, it took over the CBS affiliation and the two television stations shared ABC programming until WHTN-TV (channel 13, now WOWK-TV) signed on from Huntington a year later. In 1955, WSAZ-TV dropped DuMont after the network shut down. It is the only commercial station in the market that has never changed its primary affiliation.

One story of how the station's call letters originated dates from WSAZ radio's origins in 1923, when radio engineer Glenn Chase began airing semi-regular broadcasts from Pomeroy, Ohio. It moved across and down the Ohio River to Huntington in 1926, in part because Chase had his hands full keeping the station going. Chase later claimed that the station proved such a headache to him that he asked for the call letters WSAZ to signify that it was the "Worst Station from A to Z." A more likely explanation is that the call letters were sequentially assigned by the United States Department of Commerce after WSAX in Chicago (now defunct) and WSAY in Port Chester, New York. However, the myth persists that the calls stand for "Worst Station from A to Z", which WSAZ radio itself helped spread by using it as a slogan for many years.

In 1950, WSAZ-TV received Federal Communications Commission (FCC) permission to build a private microwave link to Cincinnati allowing viewers to get NBC programming live. As one of the nation's first privately owned microwave systems, it was a remarkable feat for one of the smallest cities in the country to have a television station (at that time). The first live broadcast was scheduled for a Labor Day baseball game, but the system broke down for four hours and forced WSAZ to broadcast a fire at a nearby hotel. The Cincinnati link was replaced in favor of one from Columbus, Ohio, in 1952.

Also in 1952, the FCC released its Sixth Report and Order, which ended the four-year-long freeze in awarding station licenses and included a realignment of VHF channel assignments. As a result, WSAZ-TV moved to channel 3 to alleviate interference with fellow NBC affiliate WLWT in Cincinnati. The channel move also created an opening for a new channel 5 station in Weston, which signed on as WJPB-TV (now sister station WDTV) in March 1954. As part of the frequency switch, the FCC granted WSAZ a boost in broadcast power, which at the time, was the highest ever authorized for a television station. This allowed the station to penetrate more of its huge viewing area, most of which is a very rugged dissected plateau. However, as the regulation of domestic television stations was normalized, WSAZ's signal strength was reduced to the same levels as others in 1956. The station's transmission tower was the tallest in North America until (now sister station) WIS-TV in Columbia, South Carolina, activated a taller tower in 1959.

=== Later years ===
Huntington Publishing sold WSAZ-AM-TV to Goodwill Stations, owner of WJR radio in Detroit and WJRT-TV in Flint, Michigan, in 1961 for $6 million– a handsome return on its purchase of a stake in WSAZ radio in 1927 (it bought full control in 1929).

Goodwill was merged into Capital Cities Communications in 1964. Capital Cities spun off the WSAZ stations in 1971 as a result of its purchase of several stations from Triangle Publications, with WSAZ radio going to Stoner Broadcasting, and channel 3 being acquired by Lee Enterprises. Emmis Communications bought the station in 2000 after Lee decided to bow out of broadcasting. Emmis then sold WSAZ to Gray Television in 2005. The Gray purchase made WSAZ-TV a sister station to fellow NBC affiliate WTAP-TV (channel 15) in Parkersburg.

Being based in Huntington, WSAZ-TV is located 50 miles (80 km) away from West Virginia's state capital, Charleston. As such, the station opened a branch studio there in 1956. It also launched a low-powered repeater on UHF channel 23 to serve the Kanawha Valley in 1995. While Charleston and its close-in suburbs receive the main WSAZ signal very well, it was marginal at best in much of the Kanawha Valley due to the area's rugged terrain. The translator was moved to channel 16 in 2003.

== News operation ==
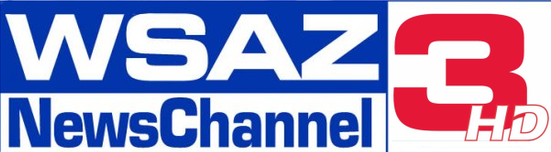
Former "WSAZ NewsChannel 3" logo, used from 2000 to 2024. This HD variant was used from 2011 onward.

Largely because of its pioneering status in the state, WSAZ is one of the country's most dominant television stations. It has been the far-and-away market leader for most of the time since records have been kept, usually boasting some of the highest-rated newscasts in the country. WCHS and WOWK have rarely come close. The station came in a close second to WCHS for a short period in late 2009–early 2010 due to lower lead-in numbers originated by The Jay Leno Show. It is one of the few times in memory that WSAZ has lost any timeslot. WSAZ has since regained first place in all timeslots. In May 2012, WSAZ had the highest rated nightly news at 6 p.m. of any station in the top 100 television markets in the United States, with its 6 a.m. and 5 p.m. newscasts ranking number-two among the Top 100. The station has always devoted significant resources to its news department, resulting in a higher-quality product than conventional wisdom would suggest for what has always been a small-to-medium market.

Since 1956, WSAZ's newscasts have featured two anchors, one based at the main studios in Huntington and the other in Charleston. NBC studied the format and used it as the basis for The Huntley-Brinkley Report anchored by Chet Huntley in New York City and David Brinkley in Washington, D.C. All of the big three networks have used this approach at one time or another since then.

Former "WSAZ Charleston" logo, used until 2017.

From 1995 to 2017, WSAZ used W16CE to provide viewers with a "split" newscast. Weeknights at 5:30, 6 and 11, the two anchors appeared together on screen until a certain point (usually 10–15 minutes into the newscast) when the show "split". For the remainder of the newscast, W16CE viewers and Suddenlink subscribers in the Kanawha Valley saw a newscast targeted specifically to them. The main station's viewers, cable subscribers in the Huntington area, and satellite viewers across the market, saw a newscast featuring coverage from Kentucky and Ohio as well as West Virginia. WSAZ called this concept "two-city news". This ended in 2017 when W16CE was shut down, but the newscasts still feature one anchor based in Huntington and one anchor based in Charleston. Outside of the aforementioned newscasts, all shows originate from the Huntington facilities. The weather and sports departments are also based there. In July 1993, WSAZ's weeknight First at Five broadcast was launched.

Since the station has traditionally been one of NBC's strongest affiliates, the network has been rumored on several occasions to buying WSAZ. However, NBCUniversal has recently sold off many of its stations outside the top 15 markets. Huntington–Charleston is currently the 70th market (the only market in the state in the top 100). Also, NBC has owned only one television station located outside the top 50 markets.

Rumors abounded soon after the Gray Television purchase of WSAZ that WTAP would scrap its news department and simulcast WSAZ's newscasts instead. WSAZ has always covered Parkersburg events anyway and has long been available on cable on the West Virginia side of that market. However, WTAP's broadcasts bring in as much revenue as WSAZ in part because WTAP is the only full-power station in Parkersburg.

WSAZ-DT2 formerly produced a prime time newscast every night for a half-hour, originally known as MyZTV Ten O'Clock News; however, when Gray Television bought full-power WQCW, it moved WSAZ's 10 p.m. news to that station and expanded that newscast to a full hour. WSAZ-DT2 currently only repeats the second hour of WSAZ NewsChannel 3 Today weekdays at 7 a.m.

WSAZ remodeled the Huntington and Charleston newsrooms in late 2010 to prepare for high definition broadcasts. On June 26, 2011, at 6 p.m., WSAZ launched the first high-definition newscast in the Charleston–Huntington market. This was the second station in the state of West Virginia, following sister station WTAP in Parkersburg. Before the transition, the Charleston–Huntington market was the largest without a newscast in either high definition or 16:9 enhanced definition widescreen.

== Technical information ==
=== Subchannels ===
The station's ATSC 1.0 channels are carried on the multiplexed signals of other Charleston–Huntington TV stations:

Subchannels provided by WSAZ-TV (ATSC 1.0)
Subchannel	Res.	Short name	Programming	ATSC 1.0 host
3.1	1080i	WSAZ-DT	NBC	WQCW
3.2	480i	MyZ	MyNetworkTV / MeTV	WVAH-TV
3.3	480i	Outlaw	Outlaw	WVAH-TV
3.4	480i	DABL	Dabl	WOWK-TV
3.5	480i	Justice	True Crime Network	WCHS-TV

On September 5, 2006, WSAZ launched a new second digital subchannel to be the area's MyNetworkTV affiliate, under the branding "MyZTV". Although it is a digital subchannel, many local cable companies, as well as satellite provider DirecTV, air WSAZ-DT2 as a separate channel on their systems. At first, it carried infomercials other than during the prime time MNT programming, but on August 29, 2009, it began a secondary affiliation with This TV carrying programming from that network during the daytime, late nights, and on weekends. MY Z also aired second showings of some of WSAZ's syndicated programs. MY Z also produced a 10 p.m. newscast, but this was moved to the full-power WQCW when WSAZ's owners acquired that station. On August 26, 2015, WSAZ announced it was dropping This TV and affiliating with the MeTV network, carrying MeTV programming from 2:30 a.m. to 6 p.m., except for a one-hour repeat of the WSAZ morning news at 7 a.m.; syndicated programs from 6 to 8 p.m. and 10 p.m. to 2:30 a.m.; and MyNetworkTV programming from 8 to 10 p.m. with MeTV all day on weekends. As contracts for syndicated programming expired, MeTV programming was added to those slots. As of 2021, MyNetworkTV programming airs from 2 to 4 a.m. on Tuesday through Saturday mornings, an increasingly common fate for the service.

=== Analog-to-digital conversion ===
WSAZ-TV ended regular programming on its analog signal, over VHF channel 3, on February 17, 2009, the original target date on which full-power television stations in the United States were to transition from analog to digital broadcasts under federal mandate (which was later pushed back to June 12, 2009). The station's digital signal remained on its pre-transition UHF channel 23, using virtual channel 3.

=== ATSC 3.0 lighthouse ===
Subchannels of WSAZ-TV (ATSC 3.0)
Subchannel	Res.	Short name	Programming
3.1	1080p	WSAZ	NBC
8.1	720p	WCHS	ABC (WCHS-TV)
8.10	1080p	T2	T2
8.11	1080p	PBTV	Pickleball TV
11.1	480p	WVAH	Catchy Comedy (WVAH-TV)
13.1	1080p	WOWK	CBS (WOWK-TV)
30.1	1080p	WQCW	The CW (WQCW)

Subchannel broadcast with digital rights management
Subchannel streamed via the Internet

=== Translator ===
- W27EF-D Charleston

Charleston translator W16CE was awarded a construction permit for a new digital signal on channel 27 on August 16, 2018. This signal was signed on November 25, 2020, with the new callsign W27EF-D. An earlier permit for digital channel 15 expired unbuilt in August 2015.

== See also ==
- Channel 3 virtual TV stations in the United States
- Channel 22 digital TV stations in the United States
- Mr. Cartoon, a local children's program produced and aired on WSAZ that aired for over 30 years
