= WOWK-TV =

Television station in Huntington, West Virginia

- Huntington–Charleston, West Virginia; United States
- City: Huntington, West Virginia
- Channels: Digital: 10 (VHF); Virtual: 13
- Branding: WOWK 13; 13 News

Programming
- Affiliations: 13.1: CBS; for others, see § Subchannels

Ownership
- Owner: Nexstar Media Group; (Nexstar Media Inc.)

History
- First air date: October 2, 1955
- Former call signs: WHTN-TV (1955–1975)
- Former channel numbers: Analog: 13 (VHF, 1955–2009); Digital: 47 (UHF, 2002–2009), 13 (VHF, 2009–2020)
- Former affiliations: ABC (1955–1958, 1962–1986); CBS (1958–1962); 33.1: PBS (temporary host for WVPB-TV, 2020–2021)
- Call sign meaning: Ohio, West Virginia, Kentucky (states served by the station's signal)

Technical information
- Licensing authority: FCC
- Facility ID: 23342
- ERP: 37 kW
- HAAT: 408 m (1,339 ft)
- Transmitter coordinates: 38°30′21.1″N 82°12′32.3″W

Links
- Public license information: Public file; LMS
- Website: www.wowktv.com

WOWK-TV (channel 13) is a television station licensed to Huntington, West Virginia, United States, serving the Charleston–Huntington market as an affiliate of CBS. Owned by Nexstar Media Group, the station maintains studios on Quarrier Street near the Charleston Town Center in downtown Charleston, and its transmitter is located in Milton, West Virginia.

== History ==
The station went on-air October 2, 1955, as WHTN-TV (for Huntington), an ABC affiliate owned by the Greater Huntington Theater Corporation. After only a year, the station was bought by Minneapolis-based Cowles Communications (unrelated to the Spokane, Washington–based Cowles Publishing Company). WHTN swapped affiliations with WCHS-TV and became a CBS station for the first time in 1958. In 1960, Cowles sold Channel 13 to Reeves Telecom. It went back to ABC in 1962 and stayed with that network for 24 years. Reeves Telecom sold the station to Gateway Communications (a company formed by employees of the former broadcasting division of Triangle Publications) in 1974, becoming the company's only ABC affiliate, and the only station owned by Gateway that was not owned by Triangle prior to its acquisition. The following March, it changed its call letters to the current WOWK-TV to reflect the three states it serves (Ohio, West Virginia, and Kentucky). On January 12, 1984, the station's original transmitter in Barkers Ridge was destroyed by a chemical fire, knocking out ABC programming at approximately 3:20 p.m. that evening. The station's chief engineer confirms that the fire started at the electrical control panel that was constructed out of both brick and concrete before spreading towards the roof. Despite nobody injured, a total of 46 people were taken to nearby hospitals for chemical related conditions. The station returned back on the air four days later on January 16, 1984. On June 1, 1986, it changed affiliations again, returning to CBS, and ABC moving to WCHS-TV. The swap brought channel 13 in-line with sister stations WLYH in Lancaster, Pennsylvania, WTAJ-TV in Altoona, Pennsylvania, and WBNG-TV in Binghamton, New York, which had recently renewed their CBS relationships.

The station was headquartered at the Radio Center Building in Huntington from its inception until 1984 when WOWK moved to a location on Fifth Avenue. Gateway merged with SJL Broadcasting in 2000. SJL sold it to West Virginia Media Holdings in 2002. After the sale to West Virginia Media, it sold its Huntington building to regional radio conglomerate Kindred Communications and moved its studio and offices to Charleston. WOWK retained a news bureau and advertising sales office for the southern portion for the market in what is now the Kindred Capital Building, and its transmitter is still located at the Milton location.

On November 17, 2015, Nexstar Broadcasting Group announced that it would purchase the West Virginia Media Holdings stations, including WOWK-TV, for $130 million. Under the terms of the deal, Nexstar assumed control of the stations through a time brokerage agreement in December 2015, with the sale of the license assets completed on January 31, 2017. Nexstar CEO Perry A. Sook was a former employee of WOWK. This made WOWK-TV reunite with former Gateway-owned sister stations WTAJ and WBNG.

On June 15, 2016, Nexstar announced that it has entered into an affiliation agreement with Katz Broadcasting for the Escape, Laff, Grit, and Bounce TV networks (the last one of which is owned by Bounce Media LLC, whose COO Jonathan Katz is president/CEO of Katz Broadcasting), bringing one or more of the four networks to 81 stations owned and/or operated by Nexstar, including WOWK-TV. (Grit was available in Charleston on WCHS-DT3 until February 28, 2017, when it was replaced by TBD. It moved to WOWK in October 2017.)

== News operation ==
WOWK-TV airs the market's only 7 p.m. newscast. The station also airs a 5 p.m. newscast. It provided weather forecasts for WVNS-TV in Beckley–Bluefield until late 2016.

On May 16, 2011, WOWK expanded its morning newscast to a 4:30 a.m. start time. It was the first station in the market, as well as in the state, to do so. The morning news expansion is a growing trend across the United States.

WOWK launched a 4 p.m. newscast titled Good Day at 4 on September 5, 2022. This is the second 4 p.m. newscast in the market.

WOWK produces a statewide evening newscast, Tonight Live at 5:30 pm (formerly West Virginia Tonight Live and West Virginia Tonight), which is simulcast across all of the former West Virginia Media Holdings stations. Tonight Live is aired at 11:30 p.m. on WDVM-TV in Hagerstown, Maryland (in the Washington, D.C. market).

Historically, WOWK's newscasts have ranked third in the market, behind WSAZ-TV and WCHS-TV. Generally, WOWK and WCHS-TV are stronger in the eastern half of the market, including Charleston. However, neither station does well in the western portion, including Huntington and the Ohio and Kentucky sides of the market.

== Technical information ==
=== Subchannels ===
The station's signal is multiplexed:

Subchannels of WOWK-TV
Subchannel	Res.	Short name	Programming
13.1	1080i	WOWKCBS	CBS
13.2	480i	Mystery	Ion Mystery
13.3	480i	Grit	Grit
13.4	480i	Rewind	Rewind TV
3.4	480i	DABL	Dabl (WSAZ-TV)

Broadcast on behalf of another station

=== Analog-to-digital conversion ===
WOWK-TV discontinued regular programming on its analog signal, over VHF channel 13, in early 2009. The station's digital signal relocated from its pre-transition UHF channel 47 to VHF channel 13. On January 25, 2009, an ice storm damaged the primary analog VHF channel 13 transmitter. Rather than repair it for two more months of service, the station shut down its analog transmission early and brought its digital channel 13 transmitter on-line.

=== Tower ===
The station's broadcast tower, WOWK Television Tower, is a 338.94-meter (1,112 ft)-tall guyed TV mast located in Huntington, West Virginia. The tower was built in 1975 and is currently the third-tallest structure in West Virginia. The tallest is the WVAH-TV tower in Scott Depot, followed by the WSAZ-TV tower.
