= Warren Township, Washington County, Ohio =

Township in Ohio, US

- Township
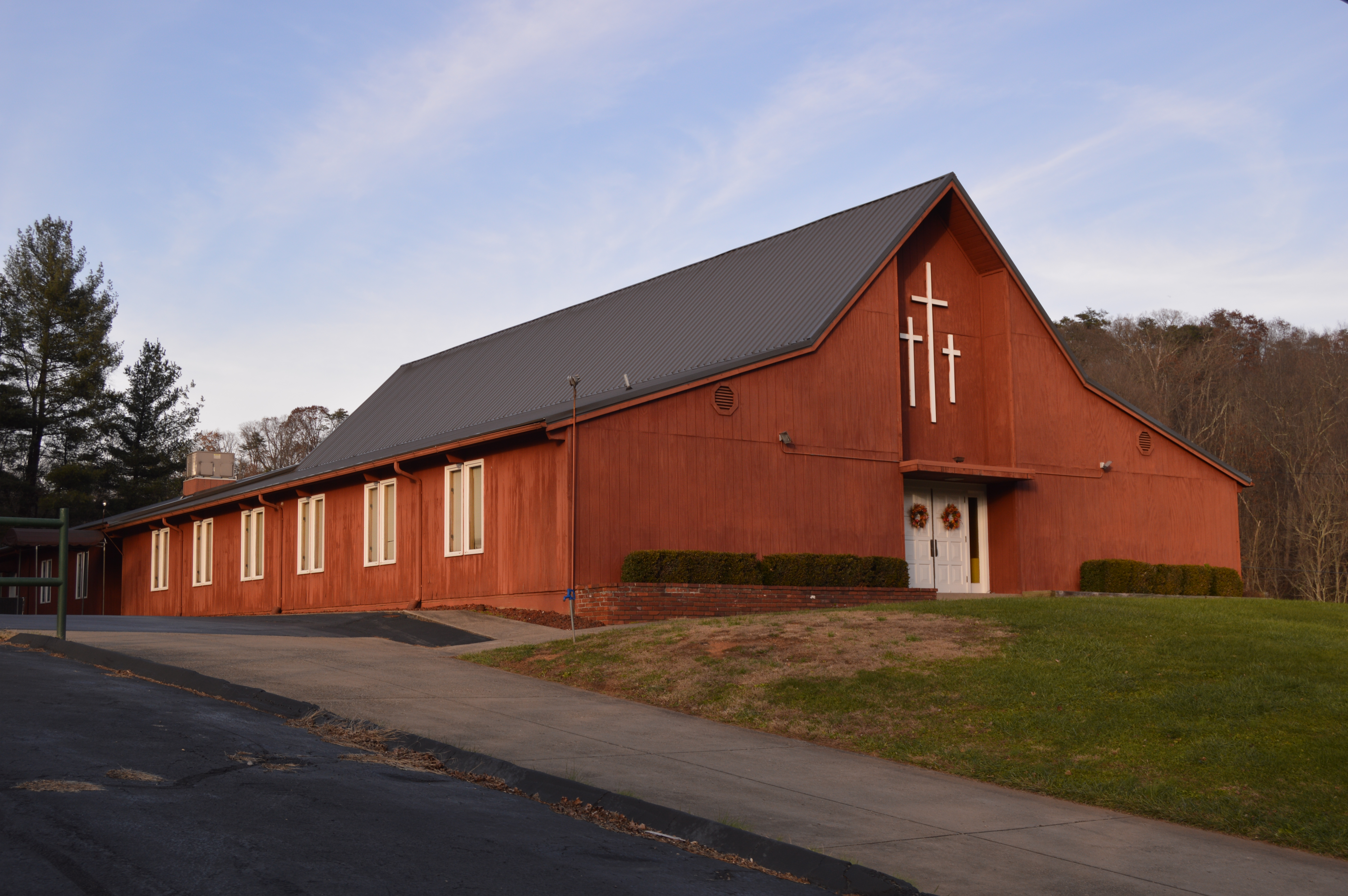
- Pinehurst Christian Church on State Route 550

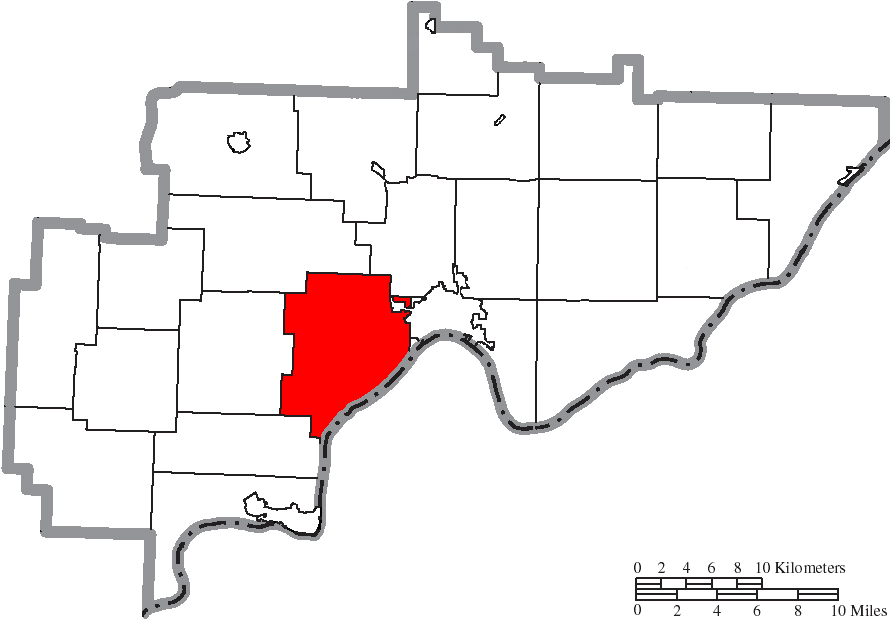
- Location of Warren Township in Washington County
- Coordinates: 39°23′58″N 81°33′9″W
- Country: United States
- State: Ohio
- County: Washington

Area
  - Total: 38.0 sq mi (98.4 km^{2})
  - Land: 37.6 sq mi (97.3 km^{2})
  - Water: 0.42 sq mi (1.1 km^{2})
- Elevation: 820 ft (250 m)

Population (2020)
  - Total: 3,948
  - Density: 105/sq mi (40.6/km^{2})
- Time zone: UTC-5 (Eastern (EST))
  - Summer (DST): UTC-4 (EDT)
- FIPS code: 39-80934
- GNIS feature ID: 1087144

Warren Township is one of the twenty-two townships of Washington County, Ohio, United States. The 2020 census found 3,948 people in the township.

== Geography ==
Located in the southern part of the county along the Ohio River, it borders the following townships:

- Watertown Township - north
- Muskingum Township - northeast
- Marietta Township - east
- Dunham Township - southwest
- Barlow Township - west

Wood County, West Virginia lies across the Ohio River to the southeast.

Small portions of the county seat of Marietta are located in northeastern Warren Township.

== Name and history ==
It is one of five Warren Townships statewide.

== Government ==
The township is governed by a three-member board of trustees, who are elected in November of odd-numbered years to a four-year term beginning on the following January 1. Two are elected in the year after the presidential election and one is elected in the year before it. There is also an elected township fiscal officer, who serves a four-year term beginning on April 1 of the year after the election, which is held in November of the year before the presidential election. Vacancies in the fiscal officership or on the board of trustees are filled by the remaining trustees.
