= Arlington, Harrison County, West Virginia =

Unincorporated community in West Virginia, United States

- Unincorporated community
- Location within West Virginia Location within the United States
- Coordinates: 39°18′30″N 80°20′48″W
- Country: United States
- State: West Virginia
- County: Harrison
- Time zone: UTC-5 (Eastern (EST))
  - Summer (DST): UTC-4 (EDT)
- GNIS feature ID: 1553744

Arlington is an unincorporated community along the West Fork River in Harrison County, West Virginia, United States. It is located directly north of the city of Clarksburg.
