= West Virginia Public Broadcasting =

Public television network in West Virginia

- Statewide West Virginia; United States
- Channels: Digital: see § TV stations and § FM stations

Programming
- Affiliations: PBS; APT; NPR; PRX; APM; BBCWS

Ownership
- Owner: West Virginia Educational Broadcasting Authority

History
- First air date: July 14, 1969
- Former affiliations: NET (1969–1970)

Links
- Website: wvpublic.org

West Virginia Public Broadcasting (WVPB) is the public television and radio state network serving the U.S. state of West Virginia. It is owned by the West Virginia Public Broadcasting Authority, an agency of the state government that holds the licenses for all Public Broadcasting Service (PBS) and National Public Radio (NPR) member stations licensed in West Virginia. It is headquartered in Charleston with studios in Morgantown and Beckley.

On January 1, 2015, West Virginia PBS and West Virginia Public Radio merged their brands, branding exclusively as "West Virginia Public Broadcasting" across radio and television.

== Television ==
The first public television station in West Virginia signed on July 14, 1969 under the callsign WMUL-TV, broadcasting from Marshall University in Huntington. In 1981, WMUL-TV changed its call letters to WPBY-TV; two years later, the public station at West Virginia University in Morgantown, WWVU-TV, was renamed WNPB-TV. WPBY-TV and WNPB-TV received their new call letters to underline that the operations were managed by the state educational broadcasting authority, and not the university system. In 1992, the state completed a microwave link that permitted it to convert WNPB and the state's third PBS station, WSWP-TV in Grandview to become repeaters of WPBY-TV in Huntington and form a state network. On January 5, 2015, WPBY-TV changed its call letters to WVPB-TV as part of an effort to unify all of West Virginia Public Broadcasting's services under a single brand; the television network had previously been branded as "West Virginia PBS", a name that was phased out starting on January 1, 2015.

The state network has a total of five low-powered repeaters serving other areas out of the range of the three full-powered stations, most notably Wheeling and Parkersburg. Three directly repeat WNPB, one repeats WVPB and one repeats WSWP.

In the past the network showed some Marshall University and West Virginia University sports content, but has abandoned this practice due to Conference USA/Big 12 exclusivity agreements with commercial and cable outlets.

The current local content consists of a daily recap of the state legislative session, shows produced by the West Virginia University medical school, and student produced news from campus weekly products from Marshall University and West Virginia State University. It also broadcasts original documentaries on West Virginia history and culture, as well as live musical performances of Mountain Stage and the West Virginia Music Hall of Fame.

The combined footprint of WVPB's television network covers almost all of West Virginia, as well as portions of Kentucky, Maryland, Ohio, Pennsylvania and Virginia. It is carried on the basic tier of all cable systems in West Virginia.

=== TV stations ===
Station	City of license (other cities served)	Channels (RF/VC)	First air date	Call letters' meaning	Former callsigns	ERP	HAAT	Facility ID	Transmitter coordinates	Public license information
WVPB-TV (Note: Flagship station)	Huntington (Charleston)	9 (VHF); 33	July 14, 1969	West Virginia Public Broadcasting	WMUL-TV (1969–1981); WPBY-TV (1981–2015)	23 kW	358.1 m (1,175 ft)	71657	38°29′41.3″N 82°12′2.5″W	Public file LMS
WSWP-TV	Grandview (Beckley/Bluefield)	8 (VHF); 9	November 1, 1970	Southern West Virginia Public Television		8.8 kW (STA); 29.9 kW (CP)	280.1 m (919 ft) (STA); 292.6 m (960 ft) (CP)	71680	37°53′46.4″N 80°59′20.3″W	Public file LMS
WNPB-TV	Morgantown (Clarksburg/Weston/ Fairmont)	34 (UHF); 24	February 23, 1969	Northern (West Virginia) Public Broadcasting	WWVU-TV (1969–1983)	660 kW	448.1 m (1,470 ft)	71676	39°41′45″N 79°45′44″W	Public file LMS

==== Translators ====
City of license	Callsign	Translating	Channel	ERP	HAAT	Facility ID	Transmitter coordinates	Owner
Cedarville	W28DR-D	WSWP-TV 9	28	10.1 kW	185 m (607 ft)	181586	38°43′43.1″N 80°39′48.3″W	West Virginia Educational Broadcasting Authority
Keyser	W16DT-D	WNPB-TV 24	16	15 kW	24.4 m (80 ft)	167356	39°22′56.3″N 79°04′44.3″W	West Virginia Educational Broadcasting Authority
Martinsburg	W27EE-D	WNPB-TV 24	27	0.3 kW	271 m (889 ft)	167357	39°27′36.3″N 78°03′44″W	West Virginia Educational Broadcasting Authority
Moorefield	W22CV-D	WNPB-TV 24	22	0.095 kW	995 m (3,264 ft)	127707	38°58′57.3″N 78°54′30″W	Valley TV Cooperative, Inc.
Parkersburg	W34FE-D	WVPB-TV 33	34	15 kW	129 m (423 ft)	167359	39°14′48.1″N 81°25′01″W	West Virginia Educational Broadcasting Authority
Romney	W21DZ-D	WNPB-TV 24	21	15 kW	260 m (853 ft)	167358	39°18′34.9″N 78°43′00.4″W	West Virginia Educational Broadcasting Authority
Wheeling	W17EF-D	WNPB-TV 24	17	15 kW	139 m (456 ft)	167354	40°03′41.3″N 80°45′07.3″W	West Virginia Educational Broadcasting Authority

On June 1, 2016, West Virginia Public Broadcasting announced a plan to shut down five of its translators — W07DN-D, W08EE-D, W09CT-D, W30CO-D, and W41AO — due to state budget cuts and changes in viewing habits. All five translators were originally planned to be taken silent for a year in order to determine a long-term plan. Operations on W08EE-D (Martinsburg) and W30CO-D (Wheeling) resumed on August 10, 2016, while the licenses for W07DN-D (Wardensville), W09CT-D (Mathias), and W41AO (Hampshire) were surrendered to the FCC for cancellation on May 26, 2017.

NOTE: W28DR-D is an anomaly in which that translator is based within the Clarksburg-Fairmont market while translating the generating Grandview/Beckley station.

== Digital television ==
=== Subchannels ===
All digital signals are multiplexed:

West Virginia Public Broadcasting multiplex
Subchannel			Res.	Short name			Programming
WVPB-TV	WSWP-TV	WNPB-TV	Res.	WVPB-TV	WSWP-TV	WNPB-TV	Programming
33.1	9.1	24.1	1080i	WVPB-D1	WSWP-D1	WNPB-D1	PBS
33.2	9.2	24.2	1080i	WVPB-D2	WSWP-D2	WNPB-D2	World (midnight–6 p.m.); West Virginia Channel (6 p.m.–midnight)
33.3	9.3	24.3	480i	WVPB-D3	WSWP-D3	WNPB-D3	PBS Kids

=== Analog-to-digital conversion ===
West Virginia Public Broadcasting's TV stations shut down their analog signals on June 12, 2009, the official date on which full-power television stations in the United States transitioned from analog to digital broadcasts under federal mandate. The station's digital channel allocations post-transition are as follows:

- WPBY-TV shut down its analog signal, over UHF channel 33; the station's digital signal remained on its pre-transition UHF channel 34, using virtual channel 33.
- WSWP-TV shut down its analog signal, over VHF channel 9; the station's digital signal relocated from its pre-transition UHF channel 53, which was among the high band UHF channels (52-69) that were removed from broadcasting use as a result of the transition, to VHF channel 10, using virtual channel 9.
- WNPB-TV shut down its analog signal, over UHF channel 24; the station's digital signal remained on its pre-transition UHF channel 33, using virtual channel 24.

== Radio ==
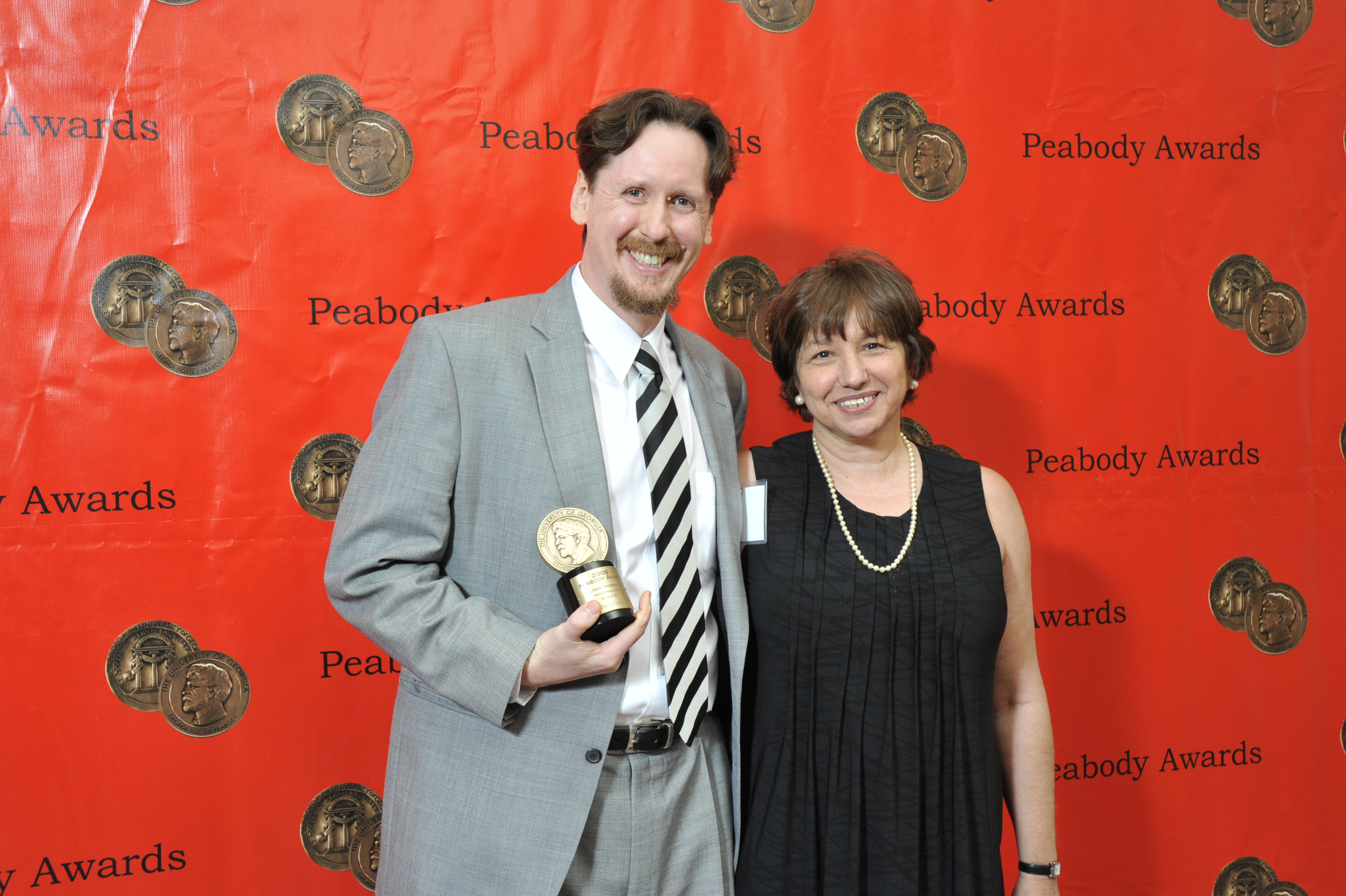
Trey Kay and Deborah George at the 69th Annual Peabody Awards for The Great Textbook War, broadcast on WVPB

WVPB's state radio network includes eleven full-powered stations and seven low-powered translators, all on the FM band. The state network carries programs from NPR, PRI and other distributors, as well as classical and folk music. WVPB produces original weekly programs, including EclecTopia, A Change of Tune, Inside Appalachia and Sidetracks, plus the nationally distributed Mountain Stage. The network was known as "West Virginia Public Radio" until WVPB's 2015 transition to a single brand.

=== FM stations ===
Call sign	Frequency	City of license	Facility ID	Class	ERP (W)	Height (m (ft))	Transmitter coordinates
WVBY	91.7 FM	Beckley	71689	B	10,400	280 m (920 ft)	37°53′46″N 80°59′21″W
WVBL	88.5 FM	Bluefield	173309	B	50,000	31.5 m (103 ft)	37°16′33.6″N 81°15′3.6″W
WVPW	88.9 FM	Buckhannon	71687	B	14,000	259 m (850 ft)	39°2′4″N 80°33′47″W
WVPB (Note: Flagship station)	88.5 FM	Charleston	70604	B	44,000	134.2 m (440 ft)	38°22′34.3″N 81°39′24″W
WVWV	89.9 FM	Huntington	71656	B	8,100	355 m (1,165 ft)	38°29′41″N 82°12′3″W
WVEP	88.9 FM	Martinsburg	70643	B	3,600	473 m (1,552 ft)	39°8′38″N 78°26′9″W
WVKM	106.7 FM	Matewan	67039	C3	4,300	229 m (751 ft)	37°36′49.0″N 82°11′22.0″W
WVPM	90.9 FM	Morgantown	70645	B	5,000	439 m (1,440 ft)	39°41′45″N 79°45′45″W
WVPG	90.3 FM	Parkersburg	70642	B1	9,000	98 m (322 ft)	39°12′44″N 81°35′30″W
WVDS	89.5 FM	Petersburg	71659	B	10,000	321.9 m (1,056 ft)	39°11′6.2″N 79°18′14.5″W
WSHC (Note: Owned by Shepherd University; broadcasts a partial schedule of WVPB programming: 6–9 a.m., 4–6 p.m. weekdays; 6–10 a.m., 8 p.m.–midnight weekends)	89.7 FM	Shepherdstown	71678	A	950	−3 m (−10 ft)	39°25′51.6″N 77°48′18″W
WVWS	89.3 FM	Webster Springs	176879	A	850	265 m (869 ft)	38°35′46.4″N 80°23′54.4″W
WVNP	89.9 FM	Wheeling	71658	B	25,000	152 m (499 ft)	40°12′58″N 80°33′31″W

==== Translators ====
In addition to five low-powered, separate-frequency translators, two low-powered boosters also extend coverage. Boosters are licensed on the same frequency as the parent station but at a different location. They are given the same callsign as the parent station with a number added to differentiate the transmitter site.

Call sign	Frequency (MHz)	City of license	Facility ID	Class	ERP (W)	Height (m (ft))	Rebroadcasts
WVEP-FM1	88.9	Charles Town	161967	D	210	63 m (207 ft)	WVEP (via booster)
W297AA	107.3	Clarksburg	71684	D	95	146.4 m (480 ft)	WVPW
W203AE	88.5	Elkins	71686	D	10	364 m (1,194 ft)	WVPW
W220BK	91.9	Logan	81396	D	10	214 m (702 ft)	WVBY
W218AT	91.5	Union	70646	D	17	387 m (1,270 ft)	WVBY
WVNP-FM1	89.9	Wheeling	161955	D	41	176 m (577 ft)	WVNP (via booster)
W217CH	91.7	Williamson	71664	D	10	256 m (840 ft)	WVPB

== Website and online services ==
West Virginia Public Broadcasting maintains a website with West Virginia news and free access to original video and audio productions. It also provides its videos through its YouTube page.

WVPB also operates a free website with educational videos and games for teachers, parents and students called West Virginia LearningMedia, part of PBS LearningMedia.
