= Channel 4 (disambiguation) =

Channel 4 is a British television station, operated by the Channel Four Television Corporation.

Channel 4 may also refer to:

== Television networks, channels and stations ==
- TV4 (Algerian TV channel), fourth Algerian public television channel, operated by EPTV Group
- Channel 4 (Australian TV channel), a digital free-to-air electronic program guide
- Canal 4 (Salvadoran TV channel), operated by Telecorporación Salvadoreña
- IRIB TV4, operated by Islamic Republic of Iran Broadcasting
- Canal 4 (Nicaraguan TV channel), a national television channel in Nicaragua
- Canal 4 (Uruguayan TV channel), formerly known as Monte Carlo TV, a Uruguayan television channel
- Canal 4 Navarra, a former television channel in Spain
- Canal 4 (Costa Rica), a Costa Rican television channel
- 4SD, a San Diego sports broadcasting network
- 4RD, a public TV channel in the Dominican Republic owned by Corporación Estatal de Radio y Televisión
- Cuatro (TV channel), a Spanish television network launched in November 2005
- DWGT-TV Channel 4, the flagship television station of the People's Television Network in the Philippines
- DZXL-TV Channel 4, a defunct television station in Manila, Philippines and the former flagship stations of ABS-CBN
- KNBC Channel 4, an NBC-affiliated television station in Los Angeles, California, United States
- La Red (Chilean TV channel) a Chilean television channel broadcasting on Channel 4 in Santiago de Chile
- MBC 4, in the Middle East
- Channel 9 MCOT HD, name that replaced channel 4 of Thailand
- Nelonen (television) (4), a Finnish broadcaster
- Play4 (TV channel), a Belgian television channel
- CCTV-4, a Chinese television channel
- RTS (Ecuadorian TV channel), a private Ecuadorian TV network
- Rete 4, Italian for Network 4, the fourth television channel in Italian analogue terrestrial television
- VTV4, a Vietnamese television channel
- S4C (Sianel Pedwar Cymru, 'Channel Four Wales'), a Welsh-language television station
- E4 (TV channel), British television channel of Channel 4
- TG4, Teilifís na Gaeilge, an Irish-language television broadcaster
- BBC Four, British television channel of the BBC
- Canal Cuatro, former name of Peruvian television station América Televisión
- Cuatro Televisión, former name of Paraguayan televisión station Telefuturo
- Venevisión, a Venezuelan television channel broadcasting on Channel 4 in Caracas, Venezuela
- WAPA-TV Channel 4, an independent television station in San Juan, Puerto Rico
- WNBC-TV Channel 4, an NBC-affiliated television station in New York City, New York, United States
- WTTV Channel 4, a CBS-affiliated television station in Bloomington, Indiana, that serves Central Indiana
- XHTV-TDT Channel 4, a television station in Mexico City, flagship of Foro TV network
- Canal Channel, an Egyptian regional television channel
- Puls 4, an Austrian television channel
- HRT 4, a Croatian television news channel
- TV4 (Poland), a Polish television channel
- Kanal 4, a Danish pay television channel
- Schweiz – Suisse – Svizzera – Svizra 4, a defunct Swiss television channel
- Das Vierte, a defunct German television channel
- BFBS 4, a defunct television channel of the British Forces Broadcasting Service
- TV 4 (Trinidad and Tobago), a defunct Trinidad and Tobago television channel
- Belarus-4, a Belarusian television channel

== Other uses ==
- Channel 4 (VoD service), a video on demand service formerly known as All 4
- Channel 4 FM, a radio station in the United Arab Emirates
- Channel 3/4 output, a channel option provided to video cassette recorders, early DVD players and video game consoles
- Quadraphonic sound or 4-channel audio, a form of surround sound
- 4chan, an English-language imageboard website
- "Channel 4" (Fear the Walking Dead), an episode of the television series Fear the Walking Dead

== See also ==
- TV4 (disambiguation)
- C4 (disambiguation)
- Channel 4 branded TV stations in the United States
- Channel 4 virtual TV stations in Canada
- Channel 4 virtual TV stations in Mexico
- Channel 4 virtual TV stations in the United States

For VHF frequencies covering 66-72 MHz:

- Channel 4 TV stations in Canada
- Channel 4 TV stations in Mexico
- Channel 4 digital TV stations in the United States
- Channel 4 low-power TV stations in the United States
