= Armenian Air Force =

Air warfare branch of Armenia's armed forces

- Հայաստանի Ռազմաօդային Ուժեր; Hayastani Razmaodayin Uzher
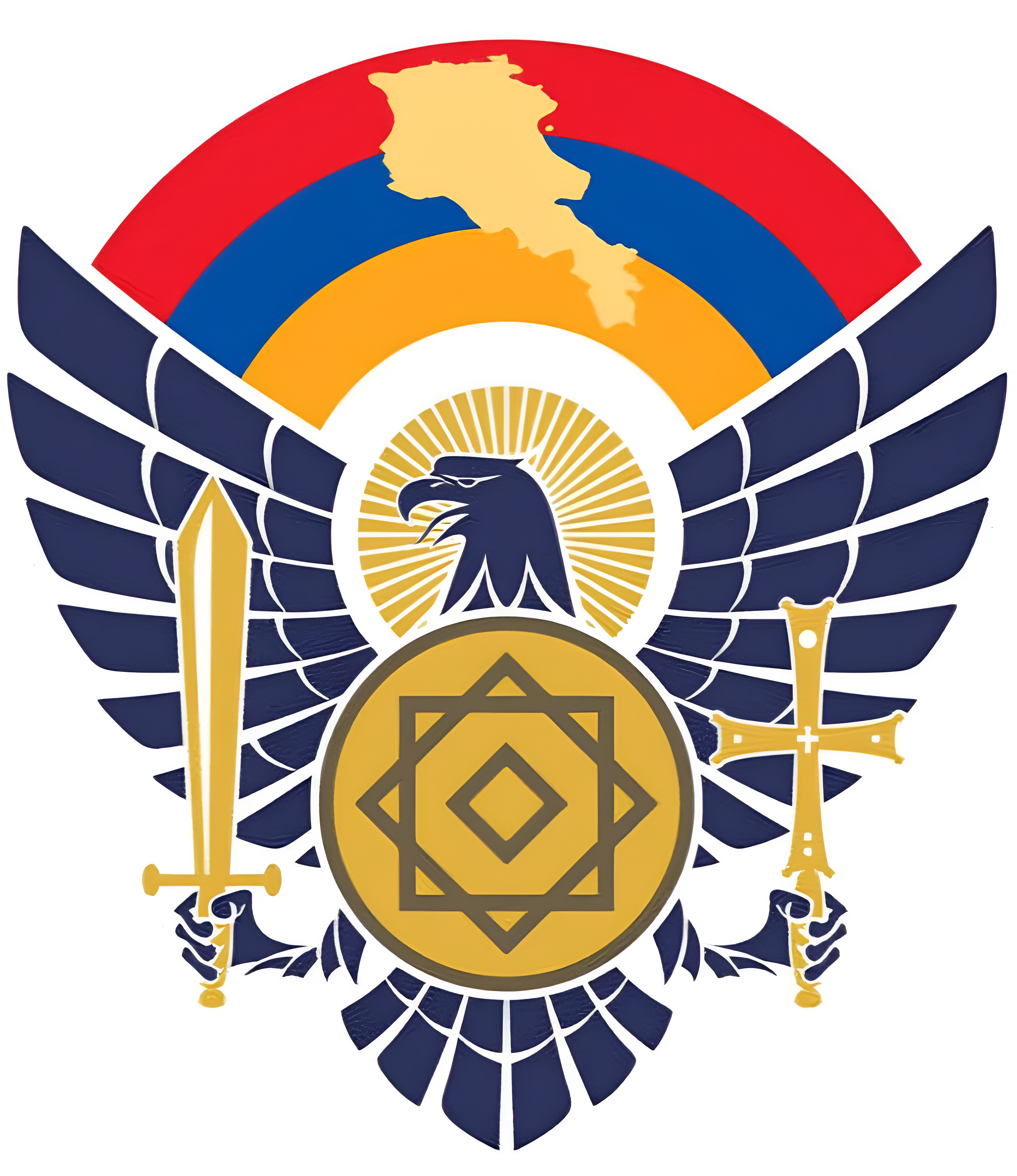
- Coat of Arms of Armenian Armed Forces
- Founded: 1992; 34 years ago
- Country: Armenia
- Type: Air force
- Role: Aerial warfare
- Size: 5,000 personnel and 74 aircraft
- Part of: Armenian Armed Forces
- Anniversaries: 26 June (Air Force Day)
- Engagements: First Nagorno-Karabakh War; 2016 Nagorno-Karabakh conflict; Second Nagorno-Karabakh War

Insignia
- Roundel

Aircraft flown
- Attack: Su-25K
- Fighter: Su-30SM
- Helicopter: Mi-2, Mi-8/Mi-17
- Attack helicopter: Mi-24
- Trainer: L-39
- Transport: Il-76M/TD

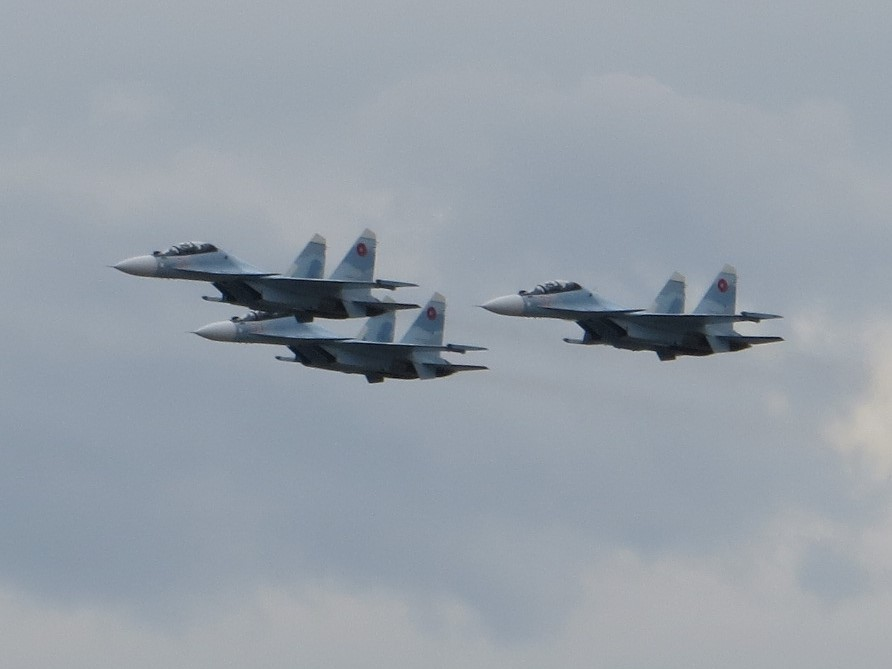
Armenian Air Force jets

The Armenian Air Force (Armenian: Հայաստանի Ռազմաօդային Ուժեր, romanized: Hayastani Razmaodayin Uzher) is the air arm of the Armed Forces of Armenia formed by independent Armenia in 1992 in the wake of the dissolution of the Soviet Union. Outside its conventional name, its understood to be collectively under the Aviation Department of the Armenian Armed Forces. It is organized and equipped principally to provide Armenian ground forces with tactical air support in the form of ground attack and airlift in mountainous terrain. It provided effective support during the battles with Azerbaijan in the Nagorno-Karabakh region from 1992 to 1994.

Since 2003, the Armenian government has been funding a modernization and enlargement of the air fleet.

== History ==
=== First Nagorno-Karabakh War ===
Although Armenia began taking over Soviet weapons shortly following the collapse of the USSR in 1991, it would not be until October 1992 that its nascent air force was able to conduct offensive combat operations. The first Armenian combat loss was suffered on 12 November 1992, when an Mi-24 gunship operating in support of the Armenians' Martuni Offensive was shot down near the village of Kazakh. On 23 November, two Mi-8 transports were hit by ground fire, downing one and seriously damaging another; another Mi-8 was lost on 30 December.

The Azeris initiated a new offensive on 1 January 1993, successfully cutting the Lachin corridor the following day and isolating Armenian forces in Nagorno-Karabakh from resupply from Armenia proper. The Armenian Air Force helped bring up reinforcements for a counterattack that began 7 January. The first day of this action, the Armenian Air Force suffered its worst single-day losses with an Mi-8, Mi-24 and a (possibly Russian) Su-25 shot down; the Su-25 may have been brought down by friendly fire. By the time the Azeri attack had been defeated at the end of the month, another three helicopters and possibly another fighter – reportedly a MiG-21 (and therefore probably Russian) – were lost.

In late March 1993, the Armenians kicked off a new offensive in the north aimed at opening a second supply route from Armenia. Operation Kelbajar involved a four-prong attack which was successful in routing Azerbaijan's 2nd Army Corps and securing control of the region. Armenian Air Force losses for amounted to one Mi-8 helicopter (on 16 April). No aircraft losses were suffered during the subsequent summer offensives of 1993 or in the next year's actions preceding the ceasefire of 16 May 1994.

Although Armenia began working to establish an independent Armenian armed forces as early as 1989, due to a lack of resources, suitably trained personnel and useful infrastructure, the government delayed formally creating an air force until August 1992, and commenced combat operations in October. However, this may not represent the first use of armed aircraft by the Armenians; an Azeri report states that the Armenians allegedly used modified civilian Mi-8 helicopters for bombing civilian targets in the Geranboi region of Azerbaijan in January 1990. The Azeris also claimed Armenian Mi-24 attack helicopters were employed in support of an assault on Shusha in February 1992. Azerbaijani helicopter gunships were also used in fighting in the region.

=== Establishment of an air force ===
In January 1992, the General Directorate of Aviation and Air Defense Forces was created as part of the newly created Ministry of Defense of Armenia. In 1992, by order of Minister of Defense Vazgen Sargsyan, the aviation department was separated from the air defense department and became a separate structure, with a separate aviation units and subunits being created. In subsequent years, in parallel with the stages of army construction, various programs for the development and improvement of the air force were implemented. As a result of the reorganization and restructuring of the DOSAAF flying club and the "Arzni" airport and their transfer in 1992 to the Ministry of Defense, the Aviation Training Center was founded. According to its December 1992 declaration for the Treaty on Conventional Armed Forces in Europe, Armenia had inherited only three operational combat aircraft and at least 13 armed helicopters from the former Soviet Union, along with a portion of its air defense network. The armed helicopter came from the former 7th Guards Helicopter Regiment and were taken over in 1991. The identities of the three combat aircraft are uncertain, but may have included one MiG-25 interceptor and two Su-25 ground-attack aircraft, probably from the former Soviet 80th Fighter-Bomber Aviation Regiment at Sitalçay air base in Azerbaijan; the helicopter force comprised Mi-8 transport and Mi-24 attack versions that had been based near Yerevan, Armenia. Other aircraft reportedly taken over by the Armenians in 1991 include six An-2, one An-24 and one An-32 transports, as well as ten Yak-52 trainers.

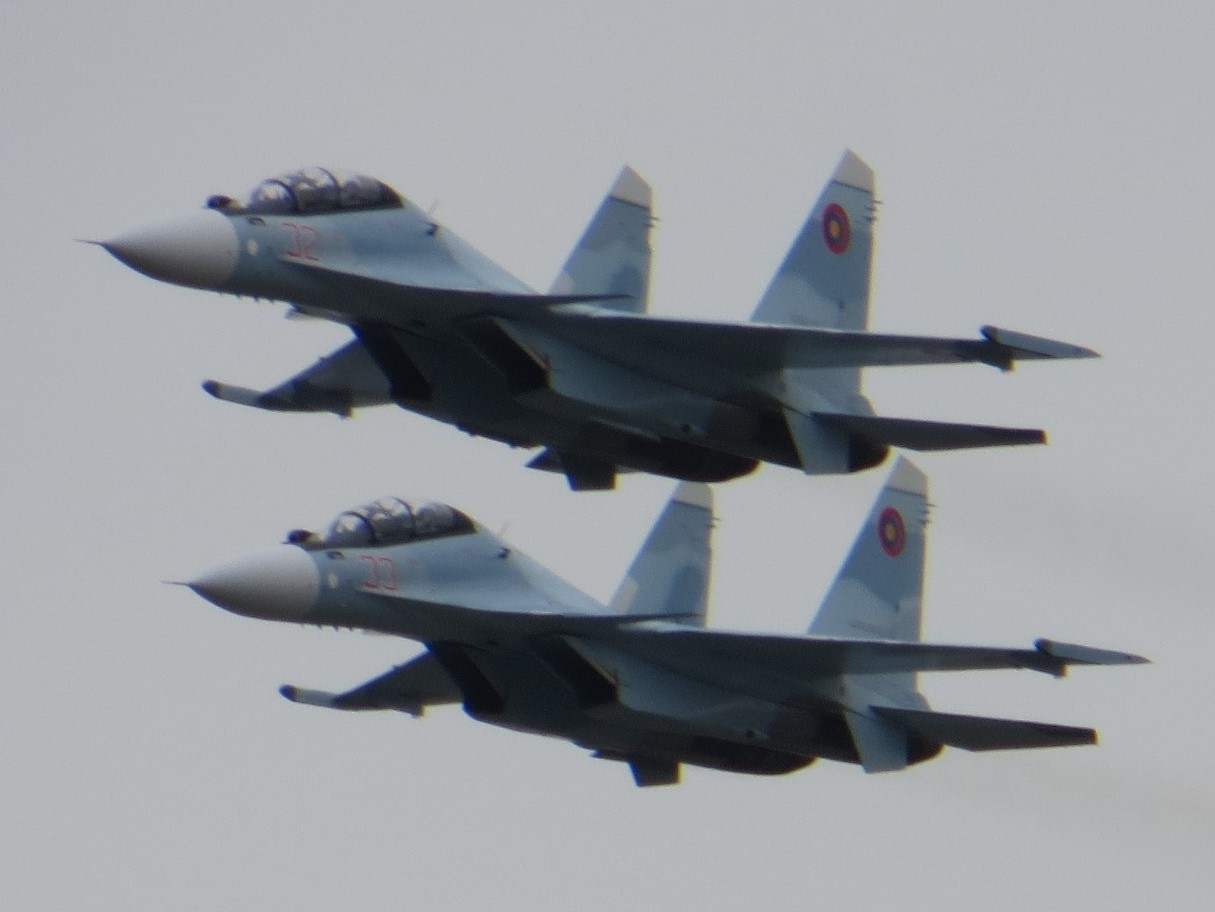
Armenian Air Force Sukhoi Su-30SMs flying on Victory Day

Territorial conflicts with Azerbaijan instigated a major expansion of Armenia's air and air defense forces in 1993–1994. The bulk of Armenia's aviation-related investment, however, went to greatly strengthening the Armenian Air Defense organization. With Russian technical assistance and contributions of anti-aircraft weapons and equipment, within a year Armenia was able to integrate most of the Soviet radars and surface-to-air missiles (SAMs) left in its territory into a coherent and effective air defense system, which it officially declared operational in April 1994. Aircraft additions were few, but by the end of 1994 the Armenian Air Force's inventory had reached an estimated 5–6 operational Su-25s (one has long been non-operational) and possibly one MiG-25 combat aircraft; two L-39 and ten Yak-52 trainers; six An-2, two An-72, one Tu-134, one Tu-154 transport aircraft; and two Mi-2, seven Mi-8/Mi-17, 15 Mi-24 helicopters.

=== 21st century ===
The Armenian Air Force experienced a major expansion and modernization in 2004–2005. It tripled its fixed-wing combat arm through the procurement of ten surplus Su-25 from Slovakia for a total of US$1 million in August 2004. These twenty-year-old aircraft – which had not been flown for a decade and required work to re-certify their flightworthiness – were delivered in September 2005. The Su-25 receipt was also originally mis-reported as an acquisition of ten Su-27 air superiority fighters, an aircraft the Slovak Air Force never operated. Also in 2004, Armenia received a pair of L-39C trainers from each of Russia and Ukraine, as well as two Il-76 transports from Russia in May.

Recently, there have been unverified reports that Armenia received up to ten Su-27s from Russia in 2006. This may have been presaged by an Azeri source which reported in October 2005 that Armenia had bought "10 fighter jets", but that, according to Azeri military sources, only 2-3 of the aircraft were Su-27s; the remainder were purportedly Su-25 jets and Mi-24 attack helicopters. Ostensibly, these would have been procured on preferential terms under the provisions of the 2002 Collective Security Treaty Organization (CSTO) agreement. To date, however, there has been no confirmation of the receipt of any of these aircraft, and it is possible that any appearance of Su-27s in Armenia may have been a deployment of Russia's own aircraft to its airbase at Yerevan. (It has also been pointed out that the Soviets never based Su-27s in Transcaucasia because it was too difficult an environment for them to operate in. Armenia's small size limits operational maneuver room and makes it difficult for them to climb to sufficient altitude.)

In January 2016, Armenian Defense Minister Seyran Ohanyan mentioned that Russia had discussed the possibility of supplying Su-30 fighters to Armenia during a four-day Russian-Armenian intergovernmental commission on bilateral military-technical cooperation. Armenia has ordered four Su-30SMs in February 2019, with deliveries expected to begin in 2020. The country plans to acquire additional Su-30SM aircraft, according to the Armenian Defense Minister David Tonoyan. On 27 December 2019, Armenia has received all four aircraft ahead of schedule. In August 2020, negotiations were under way to acquire a new batch of Su-30SM fighters, according to Armenian Defense Minister David Tonoyan. In March 2021, Nikol Pashinyan, Prime Minister of Armenia, confirmed that Armenia bought Su-30SM fighters without a missile package from Russia.

== Organization ==
Little information has been made public about the Armenian Air Force's organization. It is known that the Air Force operates within a joint Air and Air Defense Force structure, and in 2004 the Air Force comprised four functional units:

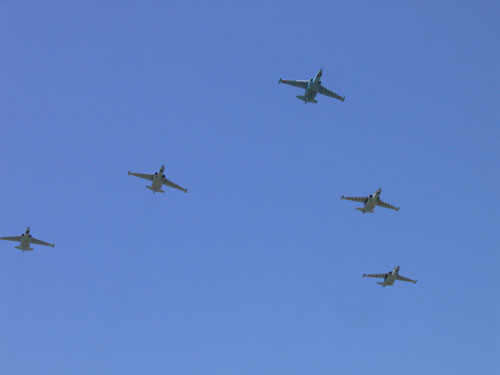
Armenian Air Force Su-25 attack aircraft fly in Vee formation over Yerevan's Republican Square.

- 121st Ground Attack Aviation Squadron (Gyumri Aviation Military Unit), based at Gyumri
- 15th Mixed Aviation Regiment, a composite helicopter squadron based at Yerevan
- 60th Aviation Training Squadron, a training center at Arzni
- 14th Aviation Squadron Aviation Military Unit based at Kapan
- 24th Aviation Squadron Aviation Military Unit based at Vanadzor

=== Airbases ===
Armenia's main airbases are located at Erebuni Airport in Yerevan and Shirak Airport in Gyumri, with the addition of a training base at Arzni Airport.

=== Air Defense Force ===
The Air Defence Force is part of the Armenian Air Force. It was equipped and organized as part of the military reform program of Ter-Grigoriants. Armenian Air Defence forces comprise an anti-aircraft missile brigade and two regiments armed with 100 missile launchers of mostly Soviet and now Russian manufacture. The previous commander of the Russian Air Force, General Vladimir Mikhaylov, said:

"On the one hand, Armenia's national system of air defence makes us happy", [he said]. "On the other, we will keep helping you, including with means and forces existing at the Russian military base No. 102 which is stationed here".

In 1992, the Air Defense Department is established by the order of the Minister of Defense. At the time, about 400 non-commissioned officers were drafted. At the same time, light anti-aircraft defense units were formed in the motorized rifle regiments and brigades, which later turned into batteries and divisions.

=== Personnel ===
In the summer of 1993, the Armenian Air Force had a personnel strength of 2,000; this had grown to 3,000 by 2004. Originally dependent on small numbers of returning experienced Armenian military personnel, reservists, conscripts, and contract foreign nationals, during 1993–1994 Armenia established its own military institutions from scratch, among which were its own aviation vocational institute at Yerevan and related training facilities. It remains reliant on conscripts, who serve for 24 months, but also employs volunteers on a contract basis with terms of 3–15 years.

Pilots and technical personnel begin their training at the Military Aviation Institute in Yerevan, which was established in 1993. Pilot candidates undertake a basic and primary flying training course which includes 80 hours on the Yak-52 and is followed by 60 hours of jet conversion and advanced training on the L-39. This training is conducted at the airbase at Arzni (sometimes misidentified as Areni), a former Soviet DOSAAF base located 30 km (19 mi) northeast of Yerevan. In 2005, the facility also operated a single Yak-18 aerobatic trainer for drop training of paratroopers. A pair of Mi-2 helicopters were also kept available for training helicopter air crews. Type conversion and advanced tactical training are conducted at operational units.

== International cooperation ==
Armenian and Russian air and air defense forces are closely integrated. To help redress its relative military weaknesses compared to Azerbaijan and Turkey, on 16 March 1995 Armenia signed a treaty with Russia giving the latter a 25-year-long military presence in Armenia. A follow-on agreement defining terms and conditions was signed 27 September 1996 which authorized the establishment of Russian aviation bases at Gyumri and Yerevan. Russian aviation forces in Armenia comprise 18 MiG-29 fighters of the 426th Fighter Squadron and the 700th Air Traffic Control Center, both at the 3624th Air Base at Erebuni Airport outside Yerevan. Russian MiG-29s arrived in four separate batches: five on 16 December 1998, five on 26 February 1999, four more on 18 June and the final four on 22 October 1999. This serial deployment of Russian aircraft to their Armenian base was initially misinterpreted as deliveries to the Armenian Air Force. The Russian MiG-29s may have supplanted an earlier deployment of MiG-23 fighters, as there have been unconfirmed reports of the latter being in service around that time, with the combined number of MiG-23s and MiG-29s at Yerevan possibly reaching as many as 30 aircraft. (There have also been unsubstantiated rumors of Armenian MiG-23 receipts.)

The Armenian Air Force participates in the CSTO's annual air defense exercises.

== Commanders ==
- General Stepan Galstyan (2003-2009)
- Major General Avetik Muradyan (until March 2019)
- Gagik Aslanyan (March 2019 - 14 October 2022)
- Hovhannes Vardanyan (17 October 2022 - Present)

== Equipment ==
=== Aircraft ===
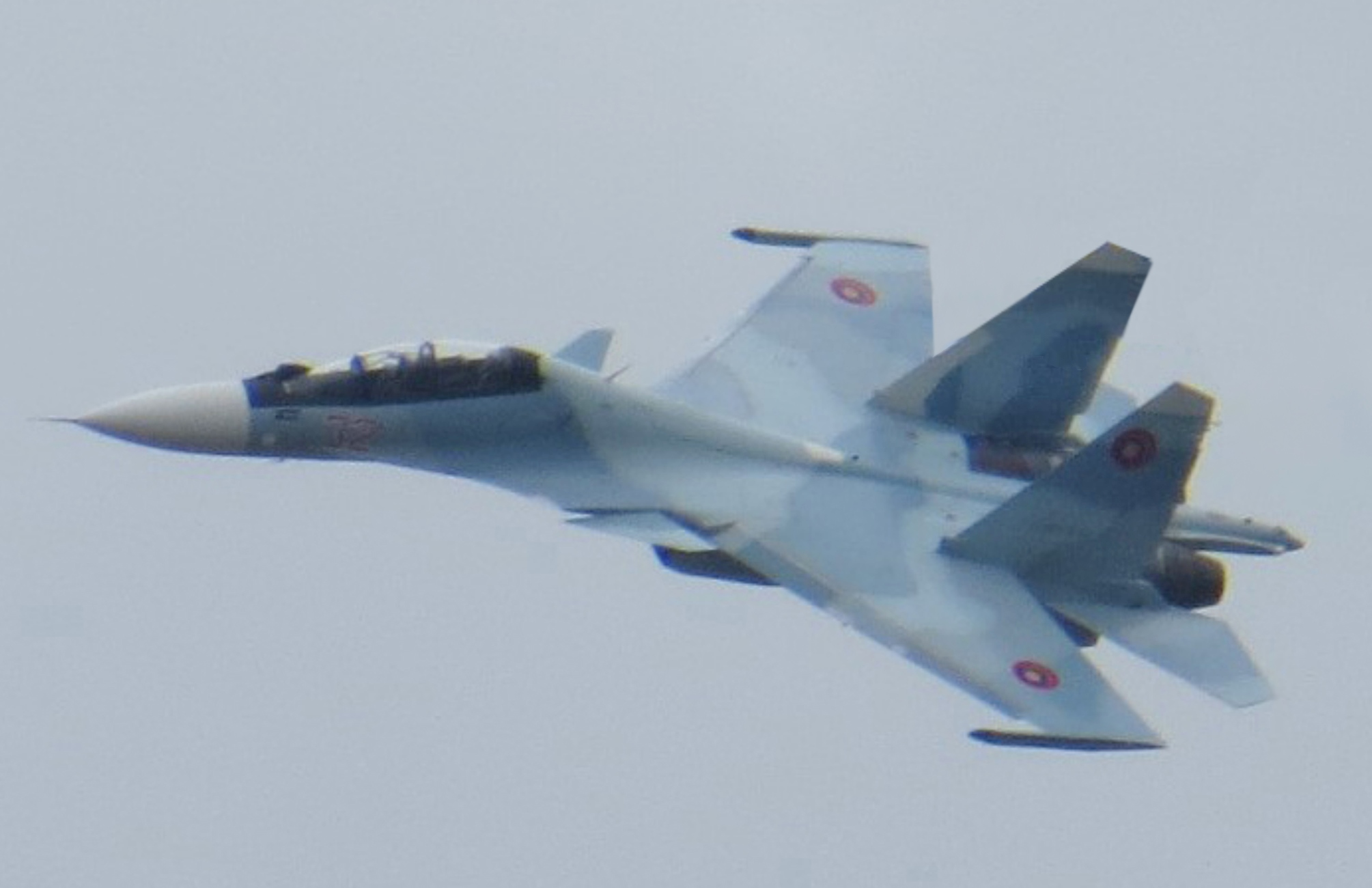
A Sukhoi Su-30SM flying on Victory Day

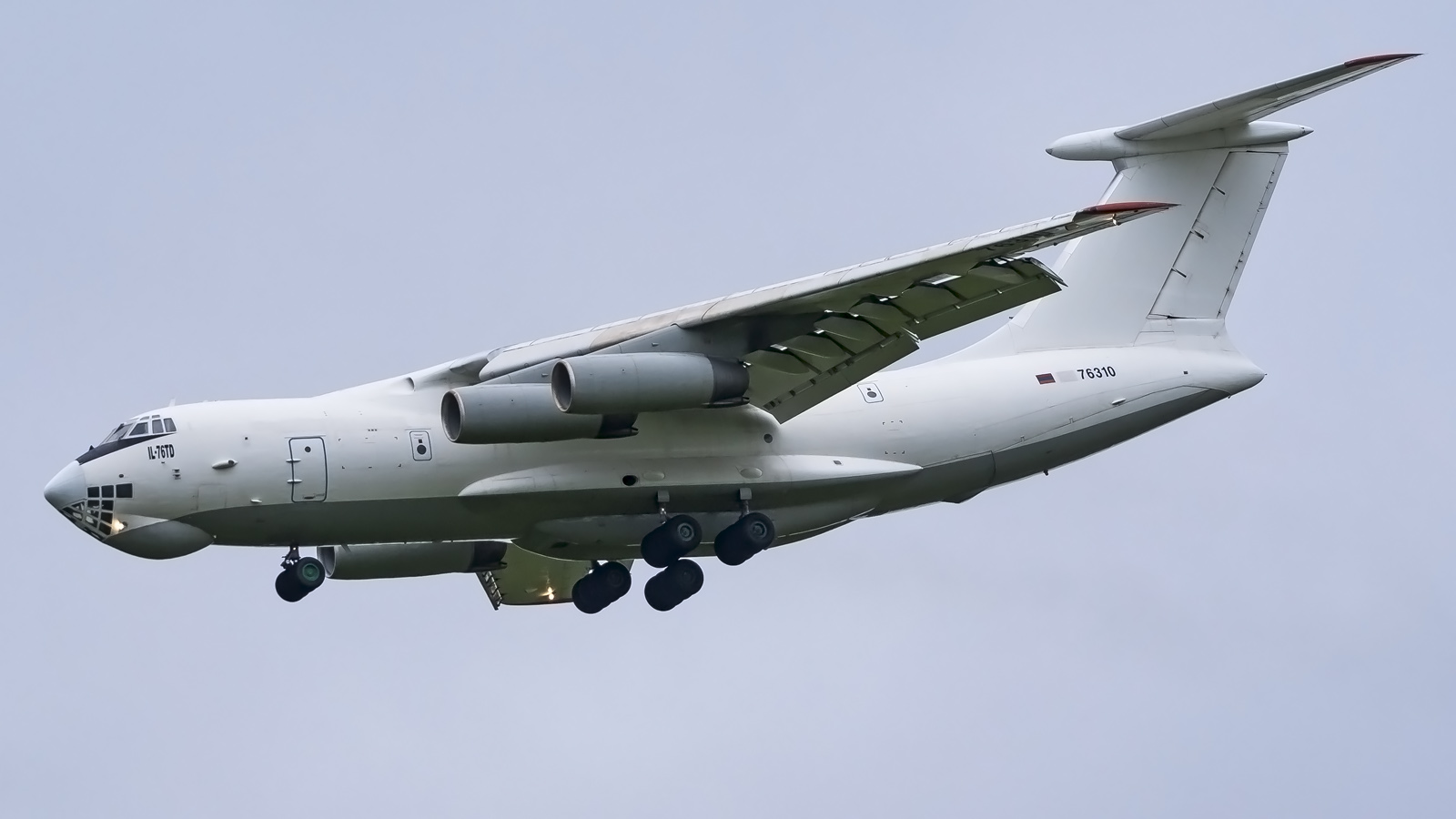
An Il-76TD of the Armenian Air Force

The table below lists aircraft belonging to Armenian Air Force.

Aircraft	Origin	Type	Version	In service	Notes
Combat aircraft
Sukhoi Su-25	Russia	Attack	Su-25K	16	+2 trainer Su-25s, listed as "Trainer aircraft" in this table.
Sukhoi Su-30	Russia	Multirole	Su-30SM	4	
Transport
Ilyushin Il-76	Russia	Strategic airlifter	Il-76M/Il-76TD	3	
Combat helicopter
Mil Mi-17	Russia	Utility	Mi-8/17/171	16	
Mil Mi-24	Russia	Attack	Mi-35	20	
Airbus H145	European Union	Utility	H145M	6	On order
Trainer aircraft
Aero L-39	Czech Republic	Jet trainer	L-39C, L-39NG	12	4 L-39NGs on order.
Mil Mi-2	Poland	Helicopter trainer	Mi-2	3	
Unmanned aerial vehicles
CH-4	China	UCAV	CH-4	Unknown	Publicly observed during Armenian military parade rehearsals in 2026.
Krunk	Armenia	Reconnaissance UAV	Krunk-25	Unknown	Indigenous UAV family developed in Armenia.
Krunk	Armenia	Reconnaissance UAV	Krunk-9	Unknown	Variant of the Krunk UAV family.
Krunk	Armenia	Reconnaissance UAV	Krunk-11	Unknown	Variant of the Krunk UAV family.
X-55	Armenia	Reconnaissance UAV	X-55	Unknown	Indigenous fixed-wing UAV introduced by the Armenian defense industry.
Army-55M	Armenia	Reconnaissance UAV	Army-55M	Unknown	Improved development of the X-55 UAV platform.
Baze	Armenia	Reconnaissance UAV	Baze	Unknown	Tactical reconnaissance UAV.
Azniv	Armenia	Reconnaissance UAV	Azniv	Unknown	Mini UAV for battlefield reconnaissance.
UL-300	Armenia	Loitering munition	UL-300	Unknown	Indigenous loitering munition UAV.
HRESH	Armenia	Loitering munition	HRESH	Unknown	Armenian loitering munition system publicly displayed after 2020.
DDS-4	Armenia	Loitering munition / Strike UAV	DDS-4	Unknown	Indigenous strike UAV system.
Orlan-10	Russia	Reconnaissance UAV	Orlan-10	Unknown	Reportedly operated by Armenian Armed Forces after the Second Nagorno-Karabakh War.
Ptero-E5	Russia	Reconnaissance UAV	Ptero-E5	Unknown	Reportedly supplied to Armenia before 2020.
MQ-35 V-BAT	United States	VTOL reconnaissance UAV	MQ-35 V-BAT	Unknown	Reportedly acquired from Shield AI.

=== Artsakh Defence Army Air Force ===
Artsakh, officially the Republic of Artsakh or the Republic of Nagorno-Karabakh (also Nagorno-Karabagh Republic or Nagorno-Karabakh Republic) was a breakaway state in the South Caucasus whose territory was internationally recognised as part of Azerbaijan. In September 2023, Azerbaijan launched a military offensive. The Azerbaijani military took control over the territory controlled by Artsakh. The government of Artsakh agreed to disarm and enter talks with Azerbaijan, resulting in the expulsion of all ethnic Armenians from the area. On 28 September 2023, the president of Artsakh signed a decree to dissolve all of the republic's institutions by 1 January 2024, bringing the existence of the republic to an end. The president later attempted to annul this decree.

By 1 October 2023, almost the entire population of the region had fled to Armenia. Azerbaijani President Ilham Aliyev visited the region on 15 October 2023 and officially raised the flag of Azerbaijan at the building that was previously used as the Artsakh Presidential Palace. On 22 December 2023, president of Artsakh said that there was no official document stipulating the dissolution of Artsakh government institutions, and his office stated that it was "empty paper". After 2023 a government of the Republic of Artsakh has continued in exile.

The table below lists aircraft belonging to Artsakh Defence Army Air Force (ADAAF) aka Nagorno-Karabakh Defence Army Air Force (Artsakh Defence Army and Nagorno-Karabakh Defence Army refer to same military). The Artsakh Defence Army (ADF) was disbanded on 20 September 2023 under the terms of the 2023 Nagorno-Karabakh ceasefire agreement following the 2023 Azerbaijani military offensive. The Nagorno-Karabakh Defence Army maintained a small air force with a personnel of around 250 men. As ADAAF was dissolved alongside ADF in 2023, it no longer exists (for 2.5 years), and thus it is questionable if the aircraft listed below as belonging to ADAAF exist at all or who is in possession of those aircraft.

The data is from World Air Forces 2026 publication, which still in 2025 lists aircraft of Nagorno-Karabakh Defence Army Air Force (under "Armenia" section, see) even though Nagorno-Karabakh Defence Army has been dissolved since September 2023.

Aircraft	Origin	Type	Version	In service	Notes
Combat aircraft
Sukhoi Su-25	Russia	Attack	Su-25	2	
Combat helicopter
Mil Mi-8	Russia	Utility	Mi-8/17/171	5	
Mil Mi-24	Russia	Attack	Mi-24	5	

=== Air defense ===
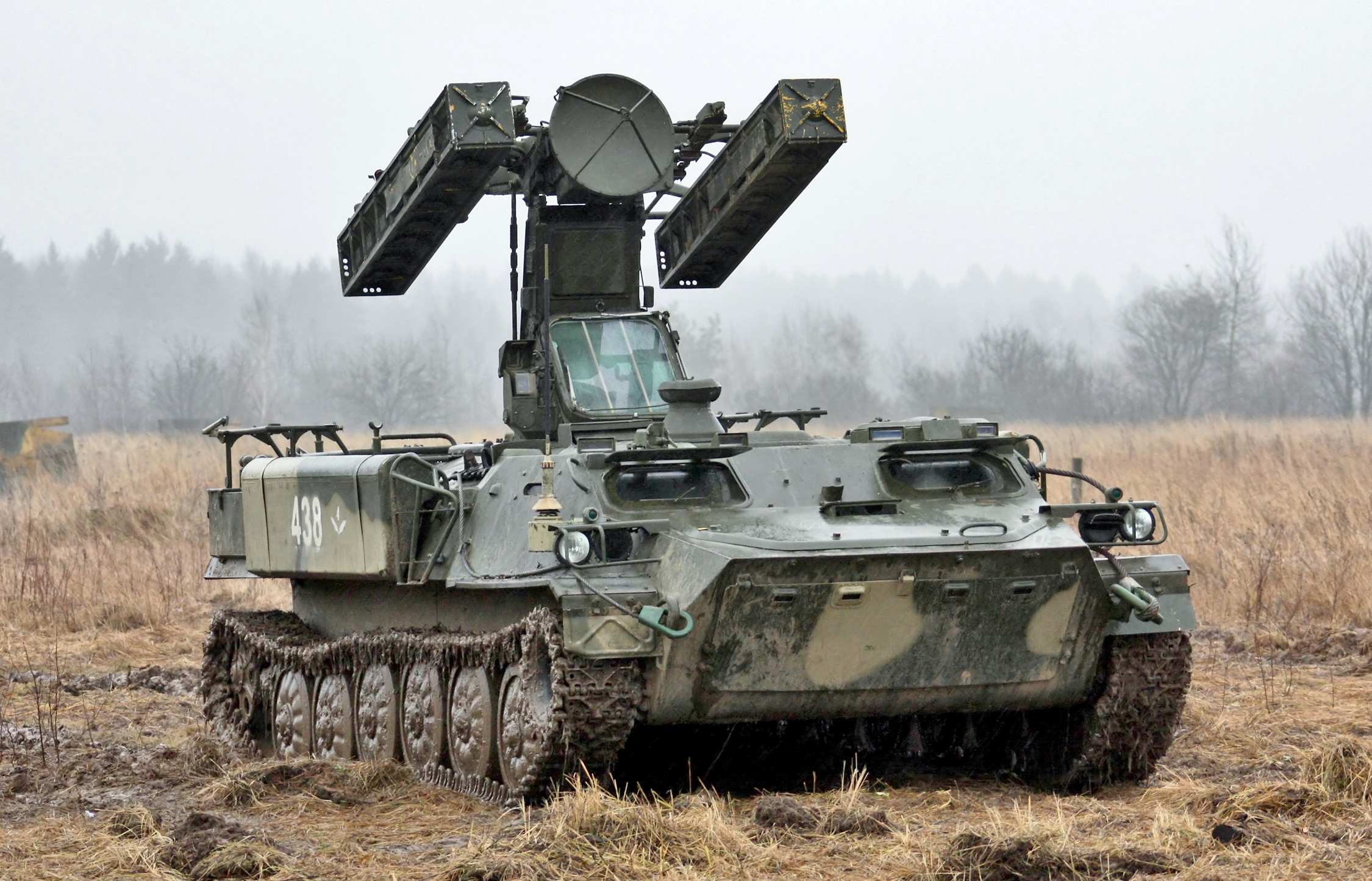
A 9k35 Strela-10 similar to this one is used by Armenia

Name	Origin	Type	Notes
SAM
2K11 Krug	Soviet Union	Mobile SAM system	4 divisions
2K12 Kub	Soviet Union	Mobile SAM system	5 divisions
9K33 Osa	Soviet Union	Mobile SAM system	20 divisions
9k35 Strela-10	Soviet Union	Mobile SAM system	12 divisions
9K37 Buk-M1-2	Soviet Union	Mobile SAM system	6 divisions
S-125 Neva	Soviet Union	Mobile SAM system	5 divisions
S-300PM	Soviet Union	Mobile SAM system	14 divisions
Air defence artillery
ZSU-23-4 Shilka	Soviet Union	Mobile anti-aircraft	Self-propelled anti-aircraft gun

== Accidents and incidents ==
- 4 November 2008: An Armenian Air Force Mi-24 attack helicopter crashed as it was preparing for a training flight, killing pilot Captain Arshak Nersisyan.
- 12 November 2014: 2014 Armenian Mil Mi-24 shootdown.
- 15 May 2017: 9K33 Osa of Armenian short-range air defence system was destroyed by Azerbaijani Armed Forces on Khojavand-Fizuli direction in Karabakh.
- 4 December 2018: An Armenian Air Force Su-25UBK two-seater trainer crashed near the town of Maralik in the Shirak region of Armenia, killing both pilots, Lieutenant Colonel Armen Babayan and Major Movses Manukyan.
- 29 September 2020: During the Second Nagorno-Karabakh War an Armenian Su-25 was destroyed, which Armenia claimed was shot down by a Turkish F-16. The Turkish and Azerbaijani governments denied this, saying that the two Armenian Su-25s crashed due to non-combat related causes.

== See also ==
- Armenian Army
- Military history of Armenia
- 1958 C-130 shootdown incident
