= IVC =

IVC can refer to:

== Places ==
- Invercargill Airport, New Zealand, IATA code
- Ivory Coast, UNDP country code
- Oflag IV-C, a German World War II prisoner-of-war camp in Colditz Castle

== Education ==
- Impington Village College
- Irvine Valley College
- Imperial Valley College

== Medicine and biology ==
- Involuntary commitment
- Inferior vena cava
- Inferior vena cava filter
- Intravenous Vitamin C
- In vitro compartmentalization

== Music ==
- International Vocal Competition 's-Hertogenbosch, a competition for opera, oratorio and lied singers

== Science and technology ==
- Indus Valley Civilisation, a Bronze Age civilisation centralized along the Indus River
- Internet Video Coding, a "free-of-charge" MPEG video coding standard
- Inter-vehicle communication
- Interactive video compositing

== Other uses ==
- Ignatian Volunteer Corps
- International Video Corporation, a manufacturer of videotape recorders in the 1960s and 70s
- Individually ventilated cage
- Invacare
- International Vale Tudo Championship
- In-vessel composting

== See also ==
- 4C (disambiguation)
- C4 (disambiguation)
