= Visual effects =

Various processes by which imagery is created

Visual effects (sometimes abbreviated as VFX) is the process by which imagery is created or manipulated outside the context of a live-action shot in filmmaking and video production. The integration of live-action footage and other live-action footage or computer-generated imagery (CGI) elements to create realistic imagery is called VFX.

VFX involves the integration of live-action footage (which may include in-camera special effects) and generated imagery (digital or optics, animals or creatures) which look realistic, but would be dangerous, expensive, impractical, time-consuming or impossible to capture on film. Visual effects using CGI have more recently become accessible to the independent filmmaker with the introduction of affordable and relatively easy-to-use animation and compositing software.

== History ==
=== Early developments ===
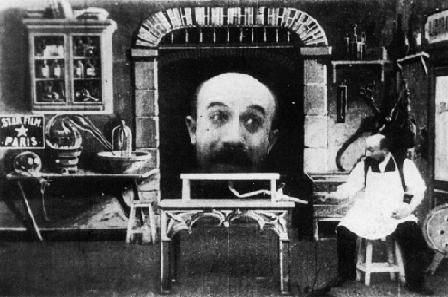
The Man with the Rubber Head

In 1857, Oscar Rejlander created the world's first "special effects" image by combining different sections of 32 negatives into a single image, making a montaged combination print. In 1895, Alfred Clark created what is commonly accepted as the first-ever motion picture special effect. While filming a reenactment of the beheading of Mary, Queen of Scots, Clark instructed an actor to step up to the block in Mary's costume. As the executioner brought the axe above his head, Clark stopped the camera, had all the actors freeze, and had the person playing Mary step off the set. He placed a Mary dummy in the actor's place, restarted filming, and allowed the executioner to bring the axe down, severing the dummy's head. Techniques like these would dominate the production of special effects for a century.

It was not only the first use of trickery in cinema, it was also the first type of photographic trickery that was only possible in a motion picture, and referred to as the "stop trick". Georges Méliès, an early motion picture pioneer, accidentally discovered the same "stop trick".

According to Méliès, his camera jammed while filming a street scene in Paris. When he screened the film, he found that the "stop trick" had caused a truck to turn into a hearse, pedestrians to change direction, and men to turn into women. Méliès, the director of the Théâtre Robert-Houdin, was inspired to develop a series of more than 500 short films, between 1896 and 1913, in the process developing or inventing such techniques as multiple exposures, time-lapse photography, dissolves, and hand-painted color.

Because of his ability to seemingly manipulate and transform reality with the cinematograph, the prolific Méliès is sometimes referred to as the "Cinemagician". His most famous film, Le Voyage dans la lune (1902), a whimsical parody of Jules Verne's From the Earth to the Moon, featured a combination of live action and animation, and also incorporated extensive miniature and matte painting work.

=== Modern ===
VFX today is heavily used in almost all movies produced. Other than films, television series and web series are also known to utilize VFX.

== Techniques ==
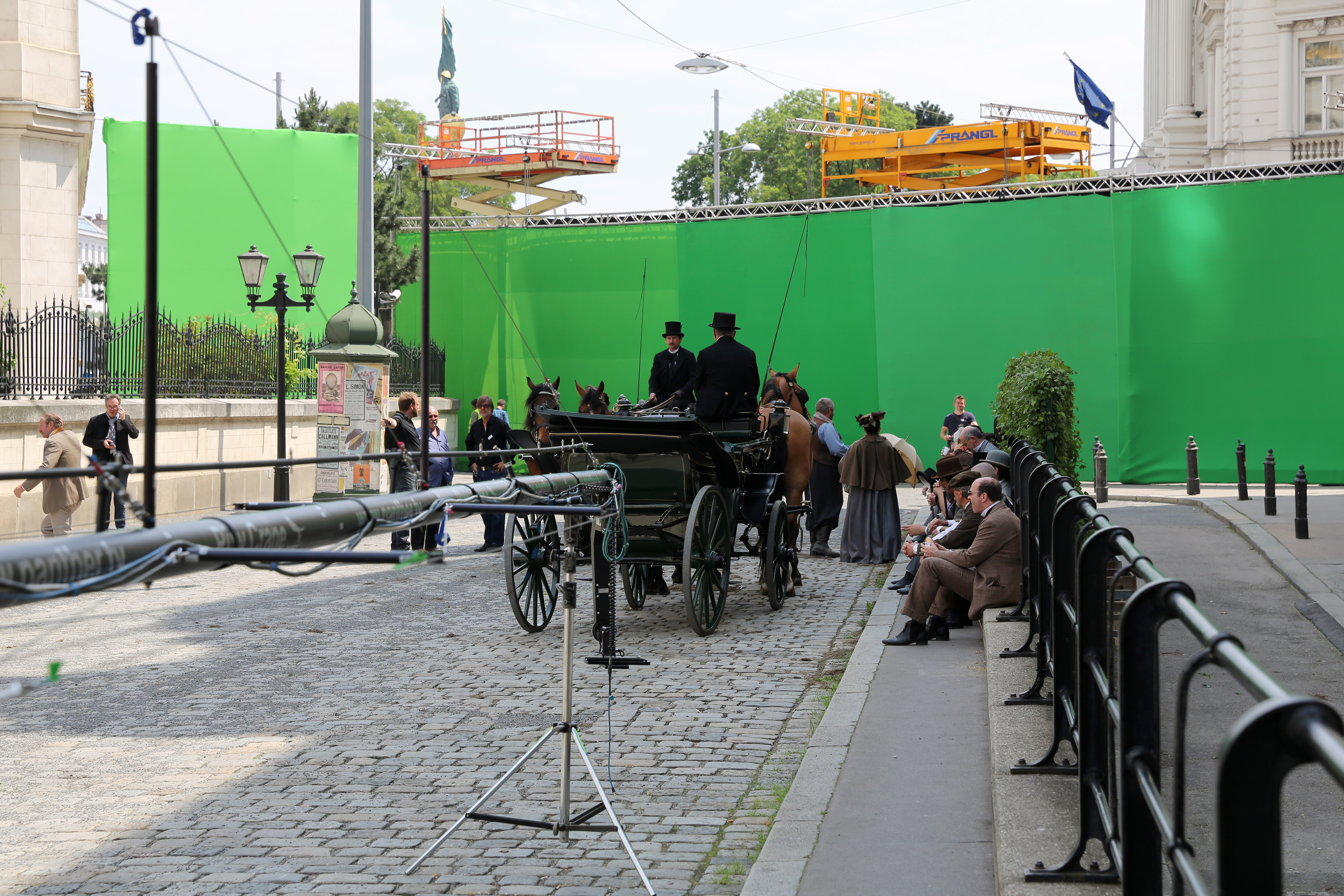
A period drama set in Vienna uses a green screen as a backdrop, to allow a background to be added during post-production.

- Special effects: Special effects (often abbreviated as SFX, SPFX, F/X or simply FX) are illusions or visual tricks used in the theatre, film, television, video game and simulator industries to simulate the fictional events in a story or virtual world. With the emergence of digital film-making, a distinction between special effects and visual effects has grown, with the latter referring to digital post-production while "special effects" refers to mechanical and optical effects. Mechanical effects (also called practical or physical effects) are usually accomplished during the live-action shooting. This includes the use of mechanized props, scenery, scale models, animatronics, pyrotechnics and atmospheric effects: creating physical wind, rain, fog, snow, clouds, making a car appear to drive by itself and blowing up a building, etc. Mechanical effects are also often incorporated into set design and makeup. For example, prosthetic makeup can be used to make an actor look like a non-human creature. Optical effects (also called photographic effects) are techniques in which images or film frames are created photographically, either "in-camera" using multiple exposures, mattes, or the Schüfftan process or in post-production using an optical printer. An optical effect might place actors or sets against a different background.

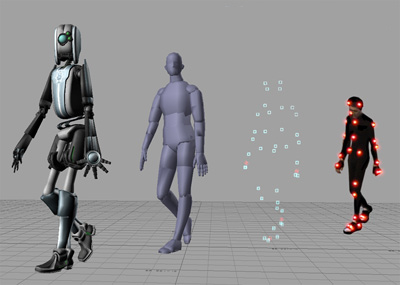
Motion Capture: A high-resolution uniquely identified active marker system with 3,600 × 3,600 resolution at 960 hertz providing real-time submillimeter positions

- Motion capture: Motion-capture (sometimes referred as mo-cap or mocap, for short) is the process of recording the movement of objects or people. It is used in military, entertainment, sports, medical applications, and for validation of computer vision and robotics. In filmmaking and video game development, it refers to recording actions of human actors, and using that information to animate digital character models in 2D or 3D computer animation. When it includes face and fingers or captures subtle expressions, it is often referred to as performance capture. In many fields, motion capture is sometimes called motion tracking, but in filmmaking and games, motion tracking usually refers more to match moving.
- Matte painting: A matte painting is a painted representation of a landscape, set, or distant location that allows filmmakers to create the illusion of an environment that is not present at the filming location. Historically, matte painters and film technicians have used various techniques to combine a matte-painted image with live-action footage. At its best, depending on the skill levels of the artists and technicians, the effect is "seamless" and creates environments that would otherwise be impossible or expensive to film. In the scenes the painting part is static and movements are integrated on it.
- Animation: Animation is a method in which figures are manipulated to appear as moving images. In traditional animation, images are drawn or painted by hand on transparent celluloid sheets to be photographed and exhibited on film. Today, most animations are made with computer-generated imagery (CGI). Computer animation can be very detailed 3D animation, while 2D computer animation can be used for stylistic reasons, low bandwidth or faster real-time renderings. Other common animation methods apply a stop-motion technique to two and three-dimensional objects like paper cutouts, puppets or clay figures. Swift progression of consecutive images with minor differences is a common approach to achieving the stylistic look of animation. The illusion—as in motion pictures in general—is thought to rely on the phi phenomenon and beta movement, but the exact causes are still uncertain. Analog mechanical animation media that rely on the rapid display of sequential images include the phénakisticope, zoetrope, flip book, praxinoscope and film. Television and video are popular electronic animation media that originally were analog and now operate digitally. For display on the computer, techniques like animated GIF and Flash animation were developed.

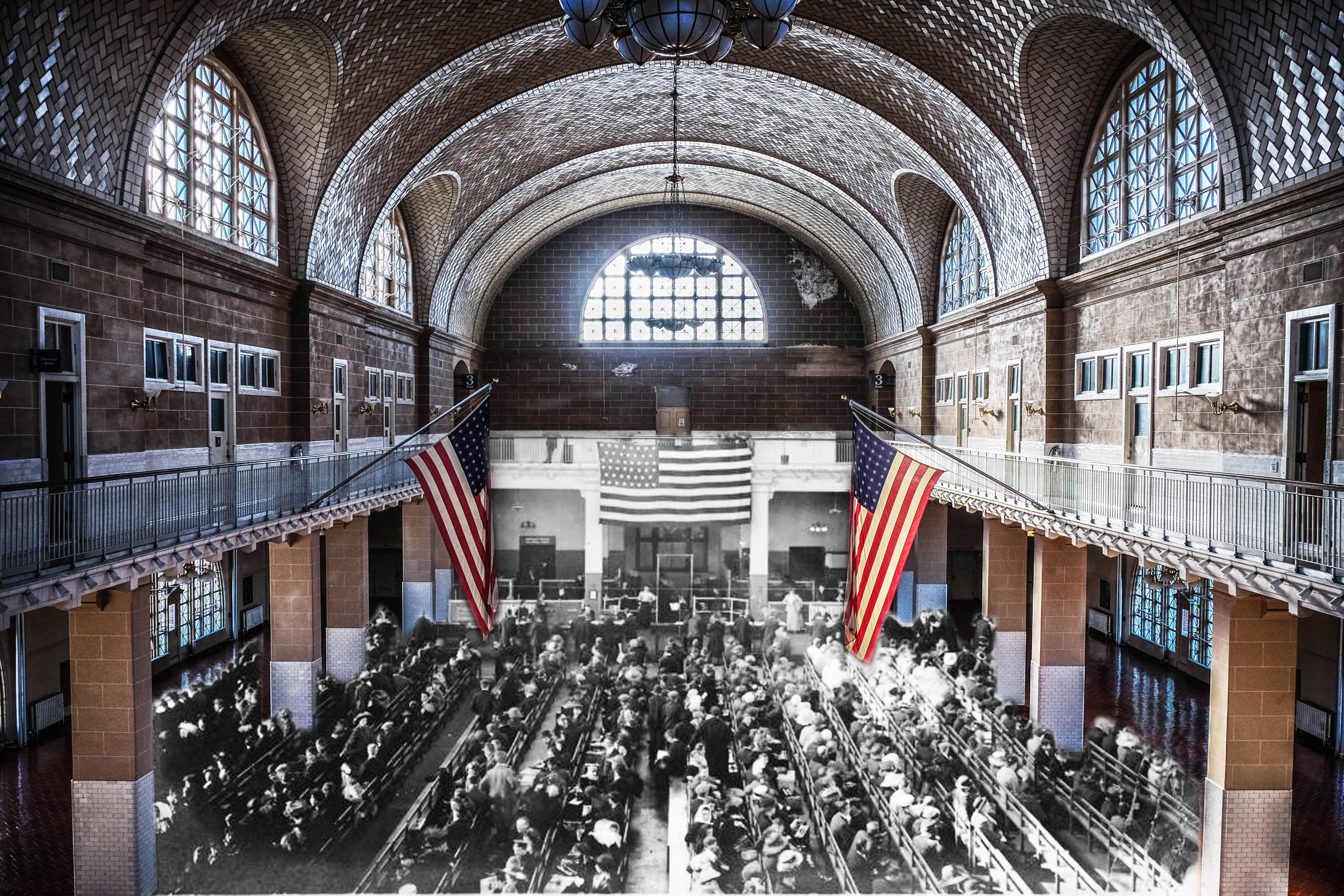
Composite of photos of one place, made more than a century apart

- 3D modeling: In 3D computer graphics, 3D modeling is the process of developing a mathematical representation of any surface of an object (either inanimate or living) in three dimensions via specialized software. The product is called a 3D model. Someone who works with 3D models may be called a 3D artist. It can be displayed as a two-dimensional image through a process called 3D rendering or used in a computer simulation of physical phenomena. The model can also be physically created using 3D printing devices.
- Rigging: Skeletal animation or rigging is a technique in computer animation in which a character (or another articulated object) is represented in two parts: a surface representation used to draw the character (called the mesh or skin) and a hierarchical set of interconnected parts (called bones, and collectively forming the skeleton or rig), a virtual armature used to animate (pose and key-frame) the mesh. While this technique is often used to animate humans and other organic figures, it only serves to make the animation process more intuitive, and the same technique can be used to control the deformation of any object—such as a door, a spoon, a building, or a galaxy. When the animated object is more general than, for example, a humanoid character, the set of "bones" may not be hierarchical or interconnected but simply represent a higher-level description of the motion of the part of the mesh it is influencing.

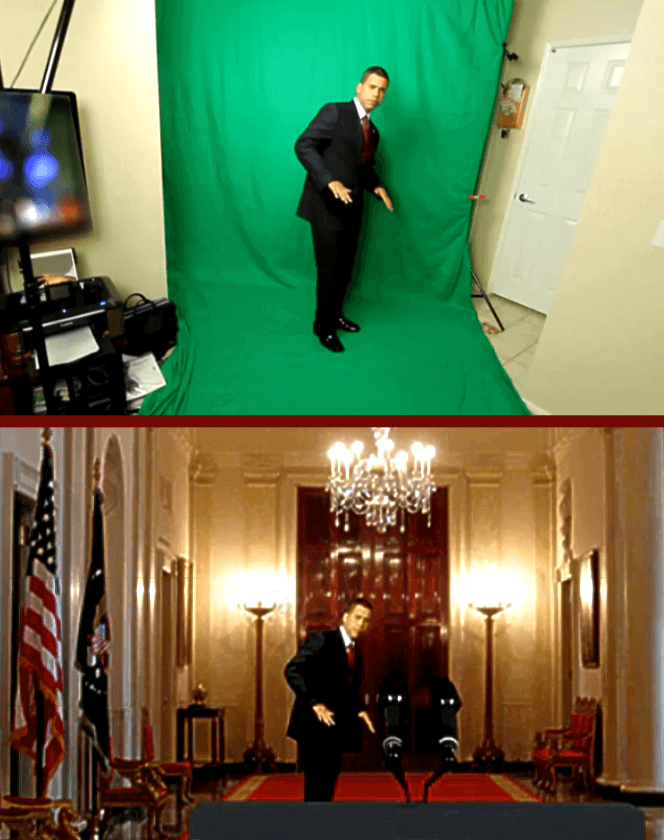
Green-screen compositing is demonstrated by actor Iman Crosson in a self-produced video. Top panel: A frame in a full-motion video shot in the actor's living room. Bottom panel: The corresponding frame in the final version in which the actor impersonates Barack Obama "appearing" outside the White House's East Room.

- Rotoscoping: Rotoscoping is an animation technique that animators use to trace over motion picture footage, frame by frame, to produce realistic action. Originally, animators projected photographed live-action movie images onto a glass panel and traced over the image. This projection equipment is referred to as a rotoscope, developed by Polish-American animator Max Fleischer. This device was eventually replaced by computers, but the process is still called rotoscoping. In the visual effects industry, rotoscoping is the technique of manually creating a matte for an element on a live-action plate so it may be composited over another background. Chroma key is more often used for this, as it is faster and requires less work, however, rotoscope is still used on subjects that are not in front of a green (or blue) screen, due to practical or economic reasons.
- Match moving: In visual effects, match-moving is a technique that allows the insertion of computer graphics into live-action footage with correct position, scale, orientation, and motion relative to the photographed objects in the shot. The term is used loosely to describe several different methods of extracting camera motion information from a motion picture. Sometimes referred to as motion-tracking or camera-solving, match moving is related to rotoscoping and photogrammetry. Match moving is sometimes confused with motion capture, which records the motion of objects, often human actors, rather than the camera. Typically, motion capture requires special cameras and sensors and a controlled environment (although recent developments such as the Kinect camera and Apple's Face ID have begun to change this). Match moving is also distinct from motion control photography, which uses mechanical hardware to execute multiple identical camera moves. Match moving, by contrast, is typically a software-based technology applied after the fact to normal footage recorded in uncontrolled environments with an ordinary camera. Match moving is primarily used to track the movement of a camera through a shot so that an identical virtual camera move can be reproduced in a 3D animation program. When new CGI elements are composited back into the original live-action shot, they will appear in a perfectly matched perspective.
- Compositing: Compositing is the combining of visual elements from separate sources into single images, often to create the illusion that all those elements are parts of the same scene. Live-action shoots for compositing is variously called "chroma key", "blue screen", "green screen" and other names. Today, most, though not all, compositing is achieved through digital image manipulation. Pre-digital compositing techniques, however, go back as far as the trick films of Georges Méliès in the late 19th century, and some are still in use.
- Splash of color: The term splash of color is the use of a colored item on an otherwise monochrome film image.

== Production pipeline ==
Visual effects are often integral to a movie's story and appeal. Although most visual effects work is completed during post-production, it usually must be carefully planned and choreographed in pre-production and production. While special effects such as explosions and car chases are made on set, visual effects are primarily executed in post-production with the use of multiple tools and technologies such as graphic design, modeling, animation and similar software. A visual effects supervisor is usually involved with the production from an early stage to work closely with production and the film's director to design, guide and lead the teams required to achieve the desired effects.

=== Visual effects companies ===
Many studios specialize in visual effects; among them are Digital Domain, DreamWorks, DNEG, Framestore, Weta Digital, Industrial Light & Magic, Pixomondo, Moving Picture Company, Animal Logic, Reel FX Animation, Sony Pictures Imageworks and Jellyfish Pictures.

== See also ==
- Animation
- Chroma key (bluescreen, greenscreen, etc.)
- Compositing
- Computer-generated imagery
- Computer animation
- Digital video effect
- Front projection effect
- Interactive video compositing
- Live-action animation
- Match moving
- Matte painting
- Optics#Visual effects
- Particle effects
- Physical effects, another category of special effects
- Rear projection effect
- Sound effect
- Special effects
- VFX creative director
- Visual Effects Society

== Sources ==
- Jeffrey A. Okun & Susan Zwerman, The VES Handbook of Visual Effects: Industry Standard VFX Practices and Procedures, Publisher: Focal Press, 2010.
- T. Porter and T. Duff, "Compositing Digital Images", Proceedings of SIGGRAPH '84, 18 (1984).
- The Art and Science of Digital Compositing (ISBN 0-12-133960-2)
- McClean, Shilo T. (2007). Digital Storytelling: The Narrative Power of Visual Effects in Film. The MIT Press. ISBN 978-0-262-13465-1.
- Mark Cotta Vaz; Craig Barron: The Invisible Art: The Legends of Movie Matte Painting. San Francisco, Cal.: Chronicle Books, 2002; ISBN 0-8118-3136-1
- Peter Ellenshaw; Ellenshaw Under Glass – Going to the Matte for Disney
- Richard Rickitt: Special Effects: The History and Technique. Billboard Books; 2nd edition, 2007; ISBN 0-8230-8408-6.
- Patel, Mayur (2009). The Digital Visual Effects Studio: The Artists and Their Work Revealed. Clock and Flame Studios. ISBN 978-1-4486-6547-1.
