= TV4 =

TV4 or TV 4 may refer to:

- TV4 (Polish TV channel), a private Polish television station
- TV4 (Swedish TV channel), a Swedish television network
  - TV4 AB, owners of the Swedish television station
- SABC TV4, a channel operated by the South African state-owned broadcaster
- Tv4 (Turkish TV channel), a Turkish television network
- Four (New Zealand TV channel), a defunct New Zealand television channel formerly named TV4
- 4ME, a digital advertorial datacasting service formerly named Television 4
- Vision Four, a cable television channel in Malaysia
- TV 4 (Estonian TV channel)
- TV-4, former name of Turkmenistan (TV channel)
- TV4 (Guanajuato), the state network of the Mexican state of Guanajuato
- TV 4, van produced by the Rocar company from 1958 to the 1960s

== See also ==
- Channel 4 (disambiguation)
- C4 (disambiguation)
