= Splash of colour =

Splash of color is an effect in film-making.

Splash of color/colour may also refer to:

- Splash of Color, Australian TV show hosted by Robert Hagan
- Splash of Colour, racehorse which won the 1990 Royal Whip Stakes
