= CCCC =

CCCC or C.C.C.C may refer to:

== Education ==
- Caroline Chisholm Catholic College, Melbourne, Australia
- Cape Cod Community College, West Barnstable, Massachusetts, US
- Central Carolina Community College, North Carolina Community College System, US
- Clark County Community College, Clark County, Nevada, US
- Cloud County Community College, Kansas, US
- Collin College, formally the Collin County Community College District, Texas, US
- Conference on College Composition and Communication
- Corpus Christi College, Cambridge, a college of the University of Cambridge, Cambridgeshire, England
  - CCCC MS, notation for manuscripts held by Parker Library, Corpus Christi College

== Organizations ==
- Cheque and Credit Clearing Company Limited
- C.C.C.C. (band), a Japanese noise music band
- China Communications Construction Company
- Coalition for Compassionate Care of California

== Religion ==
- Christ Church Cathedral Choir
- Compendium of the Catechism of the Catholic Church
- Conservative Congregational Christian Conference, a religious denomination in North America
- Community Catholic Church of Canada
- Corpus Christi Catholic Church, Wokingham

== Sports ==
- Cambridgeshire County Cricket Club
- Cheshire County Cricket Club
- Cornwall County Cricket Club
- Cumberland County Civic Center an arena located in Portland, Maine
- Cumbria County Cricket Club

== Other uses ==
- 400 (number) in Roman numerals (both forms "CCCC" and "CD")
- Only Unity Saves the Serbs (Serbian: Само Слога Србина Спасава, romanized: Samo Sloga Srbina Spasava), a Serbian slogan initialized as СССС in Cyrillic, or SSSS in Latin script.
- Center City Commuter Connection, commonly referred to as "the commuter tunnel", a passenger railroad tunnel in Center City, Philadelphia, Pennsylvania
- CCCC Miami, proposed skyscraper
- C and C++ Code Counter, a software tool for the analysis of source code, see Static program analysis

== See also ==
- Contra Costa Community College District, also known as CCCCD
- C4 (disambiguation)
- 4C (disambiguation)
- C (disambiguation)
