= X-55 (UAV) =

Armenian unmanned aerial vehicle

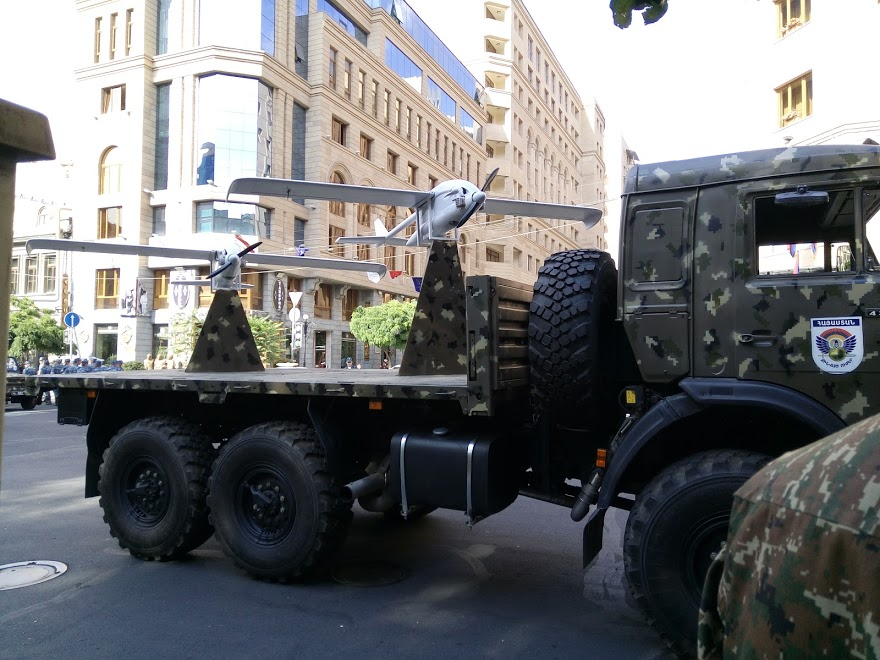

General information
- Type: Unmanned aerial vehicle
- National origin: Armenia
- Manufacturer: Armenian Defence Industry
- Status: In service
- Primary users: Armed Forces of Armenia Artsakh Defense Army

X-55 is an Armenian unmanned aerial vehicle (UAV) in service with the Armed Forces of Armenia.

== History ==
Firstly X-55 was presented at an exhibition of Armenian defence industry on 23 March 2015. As of April 2015 little is known about the X-55. It is one of four Armenian UAVs made by the Defence Industry. The previous showed UAV was Krunk, Baze, Azniv.

Azerbaijan has released claims of shooting down several Armenian X-55 drones.

== Specifications ==
- Crew: 0 (unmanned)
- Maximum takeoff weight: 50kg
- Max speed: 130 km/h
- Cruising speed: 100 km/h
- Ceiling: 4500m
- Range: 320km
- Length: 1880mm
- Wing Span: 2620mm
- Height: 940mm

== Service ==
- Armenia - Armed Forces of Armenia
- Artsakh - Artsakh Defense Army

== See also ==
- Category:Unmanned aerial vehicles of Armenia
