= Channel 4 low-power TV stations in the United States =

The following low-power television stations broadcast on digital or analog channel 4 in the United States:

- K04BJ-D in La Pine, Oregon
- K04DH-D in Gunnison, Colorado
- K04GF-D in Wolf Point, Montana
- K04GT-D in Bullhead City, Arizona
- K04GW-D in Spearfish, South Dakota
- K04HF-D in Panaca, Nevada
- K04IH-D in Baker, Montana
- K04JF-D in Nulato, Alaska
- K04JH-D in Homer, Alaska
- K04JZ-D in Gold Hill, Oregon
- K04KP-D in Northway, Alaska
- K04KV-D in Unalaska, Alaska
- K04LB-D in Pelican, Alaska
- K04LZ-D in Galena, Alaska
- K04MG-D in Wedderburn, etc., Oregon
- K04MM-D in Hyder, Alaska
- K04MN-D in Wales, Alaska
- K04MR-D in Gustavus, Alaska
- K04MT-D in Newtok, Alaska
- K04NK-D in Dolores, Colorado
- K04ON-D in Weber Canyon, Colorado
- K04OO-D in Ismay Canyon, Colorado
- K04OS-D in Reedsport, Oregon
- K04PJ-D in Hesperus, Colorado
- K04QC-D in Palermo, California
- K04QP-D in Casas Adobes, Arizona
- K04QR-D in Esparto, California
- K04QV-D in Thompson Falls, Montana
- K04QX-D in Townsend, Montana
- K04RP-D in Delta Junction, Alaska
- K04RS-D in Salinas, California
- K04RT-D in Judith Gap, Montana
- K04RU-D in Long Valley Junction, Utah
- K04RV-D in Salina & Redmond, Utah
- K04RW-D in Cedar Canyon, Utah
- K04RX-D in Preston, Idaho
- K04SA-D in Alexandria, Louisiana
- K04SB-D in Bakersfield, California
- K04SD-D in Victoria, Texas
- K04SE-D in Parker, Arizona
- K04SF-D in Gustine, California
- K14QH-D in Butte Falls, Oregon
- KAHO-LD in Woodville, Texas
- KAKZ-LD in Cathedral City, California
- KBIS-LD in Turlock, California
- KHFW-LD in Dallas, Texas
- KKSP-LD in Marshfield, Missouri
- KQSL-LD in San Rafael, California
- KRMF-LD in Reno, Nevada
- KTFB-CA in Bakersfield, California
- KTNP-LD in Colorado Springs, Colorado
- W04AG-D in Garden City, etc., Virginia
- W04BS-D in Bethel, Maine
- W04DN-D in Auburn, Alabama
- W04DW-D in Sylva, etc., North Carolina
- W04DX-D in Tallahassee, Florida
- W04DY-D in Maple Valley, Michigan
- W04DZ-D in Sutton, West Virginia
- W24EI-D in Naranjito, Puerto Rico
- WAUG-LD in Raleigh, North Carolina
- WBXF-CA in Des Moines, etc., Iowa
- WGCI-LD in Skowhegan, Maine
- WHDT-LD in Boston, Massachusetts
- WKPZ-CD in Pennington Gap, Virginia
- WMDF-LD in Miami, Florida
- WNHT-LD in Birmingham, Alabama
- WOCK-CD in Chicago, Illinois
- WPXO-LD in East Orange, New Jersey
- WTSP (DRT) in St. Petersburg, Florida
- WVDO-LD in Carolina, Puerto Rico
- WWAY-LD in Wilmington, North Carolina

The following low-power stations, which are no longer licensed, formerly broadcast on digital or analog channel 4:

- K04AI in Prescott, Arizona
- K04AU in Panguitch, Utah
- K04BN in Teasdale/Torrey, Utah
- K04BO in Marysvale, Utah
- K04BR in Green River, Utah
- K04CV in Broken Bow, Nebraska
- K04CX in Cascadia, Oregon
- K04DD-D in Weaverville, California
- K04DS-D in Kenai River, Alaska
- K04EG in Trenton, Nebraska
- K04EK in Orderville, Utah
- K04EN in Glenns Ferry, Idaho
- K04EY in Grants Pass, etc., Oregon
- K04EZ in Big Bend, etc., California
- K04FF in Forsyth, etc., Montana
- K04FR in Escalante, Utah
- K04FT in Mazama, Washington
- K04GA in Kings River, Nevada
- K04GB in Fort Bidwell, California
- K04GD in Beowawe, etc., Nevada
- K04GP-D in Alyeska, Alaska
- K04GR in Dorena, etc., Oregon
- K04GS in Crested Butte, etc., Colorado
- K04HE in Yreka, etc., California
- K04HH-D in Aspen, Colorado
- K04HK in Black Butte Ranch, Oregon
- K04HL in Ord, Nebraska
- K04HM in St. Paul Island, Alaska
- K04HN in Manila, etc., Utah
- K04HV in Sand Point, Alaska
- K04HX in Ridgecrest, etc., California
- K04IG in Kiana, Alaska
- K04IK in Noorvik, Alaska
- K04IN in Tropic, etc., Utah
- K04IR in Wainwright, Alaska
- K04IT in Point Lay, Alaska
- K04IU in Kaktovik, Alaska
- K04IW in East Price, Utah
- K04JD in Salida, etc., Colorado
- K04JR in Starr Valley, Nevada
- K04JW in Unalakleet, Alaska
- K04KG in Gateway, Colorado
- K04KN in King Salmon, Alaska
- K04KQ in Klukwan, Alaska
- K04KS in Barrow, Alaska
- K04KU in Ruby, Alaska
- K04KX in Slana, Alaska
- K04LE in Stebbins, Alaska
- K04LI in Arctic Village, Alaska
- K04LJ in Atka, Alaska
- K04LK in Akutan, Alaska
- K04LN in Takotna, Alaska
- K04LT in Deering, Alaska
- K04LU in Buckland, Alaska
- K04MB in Nikolai, Alaska
- K04MK in Chefornak, Alaska
- K04MO in Hoonah, Alaska
- K04MQ in Paxson, Alaska
- K04MV in Point Baker, Alaska
- K04MW in Pitkas Point, Alaska
- K04ND in Alakanuk, Alaska
- K04NU in Seiad Valley, California
- K04OF-D in Sargents, Colorado
- K04OH in Challis, Idaho
- K04OJ in Ticaboo, Utah
- K04OM in Collbran, Colorado
- K04OZ in Oljeto, Utah
- K04PH in Astoria, Oregon
- K04PI in Bluff & area, Utah
- K04PP in Navajo Mtn. Sch., etc., Utah
- K04RA-D in Clarksville, Arkansas
- KCDH-LP in Winnfield, Louisiana
- KDLN-LP in Newport, Oregon
- KFIQ-LP in Lubbock, Texas
- KJBW-CA in Springdale, Arkansas
- KVFR-LP in Redding, California
- W04AE in Herkimer, New York
- W04CI in Appomattox, Virginia
- W04CW in Tigerton, etc., Wisconsin
- W04DE in Laurel, Mississippi
- WLWP-LP in Millsboro, etc., Delaware
