= CH4 (disambiguation) =

CH_{4} most commonly refers to the chemical formula for methane.

CH4 may also denote:

- a postcode subdistrict of Chester, United Kingdom
- the CH-4 variant of the Cessna CH-1 Skyhook helicopter
- the CH-4 variant of the CASC Rainbow unmanned aerial vehicle
- CH-4, a submarine chaser during World War II
- Channel 4 (disambiguation)
- Church Hymnary 4th edition
- Chandrayaan-4 (CH-4), Moon lander
