= Channel 4 digital TV stations in the United States =

The following television stations broadcast on digital channel 4 in the United States:

- K04BJ-D in La Pine, Oregon, on virtual channel 7, which rebroadcasts KBNZ-LD
- K04DH-D in Gunnison, Colorado, on virtual channel 4
- K04GF-D in Wolf Point, Montana, on virtual channel 18, which rebroadcasts K18BN-D
- K04GT-D in Bullhead City, Arizona, on virtual channel 15, which rebroadcasts KNXV-TV
- K04GW-D in Spearfish, South Dakota, on virtual channel 13, which rebroadcasts KPSD-TV
- K04HF-D in Panaca, Nevada, on virtual channel 13, which rebroadcasts KTNV-TV
- K04IH-D in Baker, Montana, on virtual channel 9, which rebroadcasts KDSE
- K04IJK in Noorvik, Alaska, on virtual channel 4, which rebroadcasts K03GL-D
- K04JF-D in Nulato, Alaska, on virtual channel 4, which rebroadcasts K03GL-D
- K04JH-D in Homer, Alaska, on virtual channel 4, which rebroadcasts KTBY
- K04JZ-D in Gold Hill, Oregon, on virtual channel 10, which rebroadcasts KTVL
- K04KP-D in Northway, Alaska
- K04KV-D in Unalaska, Alaska, on virtual channel 4, which rebroadcasts K03GL-D
- K04LB-D in Pelican, Alaska, on virtual channel 4, which rebroadcasts K03GL-D
- K04LZ-D in Galena, Alaska, on virtual channel 4, which rebroadcasts K03GL-D
- K04MG-D in Wedderburn, etc., Oregon, on virtual channel 10, which rebroadcasts KOPB-TV
- K04MM-D in Hyder, Alaska, on virtual channel 4, which rebroadcasts K03GL-D
- K04MN-D in Wales, Alaska, on virtual channel 4, which rebroadcasts K03GL-D
- K04MR-D in Gustavus, Alaska, on virtual channel 4, which rebroadcasts K03GL-D
- K04MT-D in Newtok, Alaska, on virtual channel 4, which rebroadcasts K03GL-D
- K04NK-D in Dolores, Colorado, on virtual channel 4
- K04ON-D in Weber Canyon, Colorado, on virtual channel 4
- K04OO-D in Ismay Canyon, Colorado, on virtual channel 4
- K04OS-D in Reedsport, Oregon, on virtual channel 9, which rebroadcasts KEZI
- K04PJ-D in Hesperus, Colorado, on virtual channel 12, which rebroadcasts KOBF
- K04QC-D in Palermo, California, on virtual channel 22, which rebroadcasts KZVU-LD
- K04QP-D in Casas Adobes, Arizona, on virtual channel 4, which rebroadcasts KVOA
- K04QR-D in Esparto, California, on virtual channel 38
- K04QV-D in Thompson Falls, Montana, on virtual channel 4, which rebroadcasts K36BW-D
- K04QX-D in Townsend, Montana, on virtual channel 12, which rebroadcasts KTVH-DT
- K04RP-D in Delta Junction, Alaska, on virtual channel 9, which rebroadcasts KUAC-TV
- K04RS-D in Salinas, California, on virtual channel 3, which rebroadcasts KKPM-CD
- K04RT-D in Judith Gap, Montana, on virtual channel 6, which rebroadcasts KSVI
- K04RU-D in Long Valley Junction, Utah, on virtual channel 5, which rebroadcasts KSL-TV
- K04RV-D in Salina & Redmond, Utah
- K04RW-D in Cedar Canyon, Utah, on virtual channel 13, which rebroadcasts KSTU
- K04RX-D in Preston, Idaho, on virtual channel 7, which rebroadcasts KUED
- K04SA-D in Alexandria, Louisiana
- K04SD-D in Victoria, Texas, on virtual channel 4
- K04SE-D in Parker, Arizona
- K04SF-D in Gustine, California
- K46II-D in Bakersfield, California, on virtual channel 46, which rebroadcasts K23OM-D
- KAHO-LD in Woodville, Texas, on virtual channel 4
- KAKZ-LD in Cathedral City, California, on virtual channel 4
- KBEH in Garden Grove, California, which uses KSCN-TV's spectrum, on virtual channel 63
- KBIS-LD in Turlock, California, on virtual channel 38
- KHDE-LD in Denver, Colorado, moving from channel 50, on virtual channel 51
- KHFW-LD in Dallas, Texas, on virtual channel 35
- KQSL-LD in San Rafael, California, on virtual channel 17, which rebroadcasts KKPM-CD
- KRMF-LD in Reno, Nevada, on virtual channel 7
- KTNP-LD in Colorado Springs, Colorado
- KWHY-TV in Los Angeles, California, on virtual channel 22
- W04BS-D in Bethel, Maine, on virtual channel 10, which rebroadcasts WCBB
- W04DN-D in Auburn, Alabama
- W04DW-D in Sylva, etc., North Carolina, on virtual channel 4, which rebroadcasts WYFF
- W04DX-D in Tallahassee, Florida
- W04DY-D in Maple Valley, Michigan, on virtual channel 4
- W04DZ-D in Sutton, West Virginia
- W24EI-D in Naranjito, Puerto Rico, on virtual channel 10
- WACP in Atlantic City, New Jersey, on virtual channel 4
- WAUG-LD in Raleigh, North Carolina, on virtual channel 8
- WGCI-LD in Skowhegan, Maine, on virtual channel 2, which rebroadcasts WLBZ
- WHBF-TV in Rock Island, Illinois, on virtual channel 4
- WHDT-LD in Boston, Massachusetts, on virtual channel 3
- WLMA in Lima, Ohio, on virtual channel 44, which rebroadcasts WTLW-LD
- WMDF-LD in Miami, Florida, on virtual channel 3
- WNGH-TV in Chatsworth, Georgia, on virtual channel 18
- WNHT-LD in Birmingham, Alabama
- WOCK-CD in Chicago, Illinois, on virtual channel 13
- WPXO-LD in East Orange, New Jersey, on virtual channel 34
- WQED in Pittsburgh, Pennsylvania, on virtual channel 13
- WTSP (DRT) in Hernando, Florida, on virtual channel 10
- WVDO-LD in Carolina, Puerto Rico, on virtual channel 22
- WWAY-LD in Wilmington, North Carolina

The following stations, which formerly broadcast on digital channel 4, are no longer licensed:

- K04DD-D in Weaverville, California
- K04DS-D in Kenai River, Alaska
- K04GP-D in Alyeska, Alaska
- K04HH-D in Aspen, Colorado
- K04OF-D in Sargents, Colorado
- K04QO-D in Delta Junction, Alaska
- K04RA-D in Clarksville, Arkansas
- K27MK-D in St. George, Utah
- W04AG-D in Garden City, etc., Virginia
- W04DG-D in Birmingham, Alabama
