= CIV =

Civ or CIV may refer to:

== Arts and entertainment ==
- CIV (band), a punk rock music group (1994–2000)
- Civ (imprint), in order-to-print publishing
- Civilization (1980 board game)
- Civilization (series), a video game series (1991–2025)
- International Stained Glass Center, a gallery and museum dedicated to stained glass and glass art in Chartres, France

== International relations ==
- CIV (rail travel), an international convention
- Civilian, or non-military
- "Caritas in Veritate", a 2009 papal encyclical
- Chilkat Indian Village, federally recognized Native American tribe in Alaska
- City of London Imperial Volunteers, a British unit during the Second Boer War

== Science ==
- Corona inception voltage, in astrophysics
- Critical ionization velocity, in electrical engineering

== Other uses ==
- 104 (number), or CIV in Roman numerals
- Ivory Coast, in sport (IOC/FIFA/FIBA:CIV)

== See also ==
- C4 (disambiguation) or C IV
- Civilization (disambiguation)
