= 4C =

4C may refer to:

- "4C" (Person of Interest), an episode of the TV series Person of Interest
- 4C Array, a cylindrical paraboloid radio telescope at the Mullard Radio Astronomy Observatory
- 4C Entity, a consortium to establish a platform for digital rights management schemes
- Alfa Romeo 4C, a sports car
- Fourth Cambridge Survey of Radio Sources
- Cape Cod Community College (4Cs)
- 4/C, a proposed supertall skyscraper in Seattle, Washington
- LATAM Colombia, a Colombian airline IATA code
- STD-4C, a classification of cluster mailboxes defined by the United States Postal Service
- 4C, a grade of afro-textured hair in the Andre Walker Hair Typing System
- 4C, the production code for the 1975 Doctor Who serial The Ark in Space
- The 4 C's or marketing mix, a business tool used in marketing products
- The 4 C's of 21st century skills education: Collaboration, Communication, Critical thinking, Creativity
- FourCC, a four-character code used in software for identifying an object
- Zen 4c

== See also ==
- C (disambiguation)
- 4 (disambiguation)
- Long March 4C, a Chinese rocket
- Oflag IV-C, a German Army prisoner-of-war camps for officers in World War II in Colditz Castle
- Studio 4°C, a Japanese animation studio
- 4-C's of Diamond Grading
- IVC (disambiguation)
- CCCC (disambiguation)
- C4 (disambiguation)
