= Channel 4 virtual TV stations in Mexico =

The following television stations operate on virtual channel 4 in Mexico:

== Regional networks ==
- TV4 in the state of Guanajuato
- Radio y Televisión de Guerrero in the state of Guerrero
- Sistema Quintanarroense de Comunicación Social in the state of Quintana Roo

== Local stations ==
- XHBC-TDT in Mexicali, Baja California
- XHBR-TDT in Nuevo Laredo, Tamaulipas
- XHCCA-TDT in Campeche, Campeche
- XHGK-TDT in Tapachula, Chiapas
- XHTV-TDT in Mexico City
- XHUAD-TDT in Durango, Durango
- XHG-TDT in Guadalajara, Jalisco
- XHKG-TDT in Tepic, Nayarit
- XEFB-TDT in Monterrey, Nuevo León
- XHBO-TDT in Oaxaca, Oaxaca
- XHP-TDT in Puebla, Puebla
- XHROSL-TDT in San Luis Potosí, San Luis Potosí
- XHS-TDT in Ensenada, Baja California
- XHST-TDT in Mérida, Yucatán
- XHTPZ-TDT in Tampico, Tamaulipas
