= Ignatian Volunteer Corps =

ACC volunteer service

https://www.ivcusa.org/

The Ignatian Volunteer Corps (IVC) is an American-Catholic volunteer service which matches volunteers with charities and nonprofits. IVC supports members of its corps through monthly faith sharing meetings, occasional retreats, and opportunities for one on one spiritual reflection in the Ignatian tradition.

The IVC head office is located in Baltimore, Maryland, US.

== History ==
IVC was founded in September, 1995 by Jesuit teachers Jim Conroy S.J. and Charlie Costello S.J. with eleven members in three cities (Philadelphia, Baltimore, Washington D.C.). The Corps was originally created as a program for retired and semi-retired women and men, age 50 and over, with two major components: ministry to the poor and reflection on that ministry.

In 2019, IVC initiated a new major initiative, the Currie Alumni Partnership for Service (CAPS), named after Fr. Charlie Currie, SJ. IVC now works with the alumni associations of Jesuit colleges, universities, secondary schools, and other programs to recruit new service corps members.

By 2023, over 600 corps members were working with over 300 social service non-profit partner agencies.

== The Program ==
IVC members commit to 600 hours a year (roughly two days a week) of skilled service with local charities. Members commit to one year of service with the option to renew that commitment each year.

IVC works with partner community organizations addressing social problems. Candidates for service positions are screened and vetted by region directors, with suitable candidates matched with a service placement based on their skills, experience, and interest.

Volunteer work includes literacy and education programs, soup kitchens and shelters, advice and counseling programs, and healthcare.

Volunteers will also go through a spiritual support program which includes personal reflection, counselling with a Spiritual Reflector, monthly meetings with other volunteers and annual retreats.

== Leadership ==
The IVC national office is located in Baltimore, Maryland.

The organization relies on a network of Directors and Regional Councils, led by a President/CEO and a national Board of Directors.

In 2002, Jim Conroy stepped down from the executive director position in order to continue his Jesuit mission of service elsewhere. He continued to serve on the board of directors.

Charlie Costello died on October 29, 2004.

== IVC's roots ==
IVC accepts and encourages Ignatian volunteers of all Christian faiths.

The program is rooted in the spirituality of St. Ignatius of Loyola, founder of the Society of Jesus. While members of the Society of Jesus, or Jesuits, are members of a religious order, IVC is open to laity from all Christian denominations to experience Ignatian spirituality.

Ignatian spirituality is the practice of taking time to reflect and pray, to imitate Jesus and to discern God's calling. IVC borrows much from St. Ignatius of Loyola - his commitment to people who are marginalized and abandoned, his compassion and his desire to bring about reconciliation in the world through love.

The ideas of mission and reflection appear frequently in the Spiritual Reflection component of IVC. Ignatius writes in The Spiritual Exercises, "Consider the address which Christ our Lord makes to all his servants and friends whom He sends on this enterprise, recommending to them to seek to help all, first by attracting them to the highest spiritual poverty, and should it please the Divine Majesty, and should he deign to choose them for it, even to actual poverty." IVC promotes the expression of divine love through service in the world.

== 2007 CARA Study ==
In January 2007, IVC turned to the Center for Applied Research in the Apostolate (CARA) at Georgetown University in order to better understand the effect of IVC on its former and current volunteers, spouses and spiritual reflectors. The resulting national survey found that over 93% felt that in their work with IVC, they were spending their retirement in a fulfilling way. 91% of volunteers felt that the spiritual reflection component of IVC had somewhat or very much helped them to see God in the people they served. One volunteer said, “The most satisfying [experience] was the looks on the faces of nearly a dozen cook-trainees when I responded to an inquiry by one of them as to why I did this individual resource for them. I answered: “Because I love you.” The silence was absolute for maybe a minute and then they all stood as one and applauded; at least four of us were crying.”
