= C4 antisense RNA =

c4 antisense RNA
- Conserved secondary structure of c4 antisense RNA

Identifiers
- Symbol: c4
- Rfam: RF01695

Other data
- RNA type: Antisense
- Domain: Bacteriophage
- PDB structures: PDBe

Consensus secondary structure of the a1, b1 target of c4 antisense RNAs; these targets are also called IsrK. This figure is adapted from a previous publication.

The c4 antisense RNA is a non-coding RNA used by certain phages that infect bacteria. It was initially identified in the P1 and P7 phages of E. coli. The identification of c4 antisense RNAs solved the mystery of the mechanism for regulation of the ant gene, which is an anti-repressor.

The c4 antisense RNA has two regions, called a' and b' (see diagram), that are complementary to its targets. It has two targets, designated a1, b1 and a2, b2. The a1, b1 site is upstream of the c4 RNA, while the a2, b2 site is immediately downstream of it. The ant gene itself is immediately downstream of the a2, b2 target site. Binding of the a2, b2 site by the c4 antisense RNA represses the ant gene. The function of the a1, b1 site is unknown, but it was suggested that they might compete with the a2, b2 site for binding to c4 RNA.

Bioinformatics analysis uncovered many homologs of the c4 antisense RNA that conserve the secondary structure originally proposed for it. These homologs are present in purified phage particles of other phages, as well as bacterial genomes. The presence of c4 antisense RNAs in bacteria is to be expected, since the P1 and P7 phages are temperate and can stably integrate into the host genome. The c4 antisense RNA consists of a three-stem junction. The terminus of the stem designated as "P2" very often conforms to highly stable tetraloop motifs that were previously elucidated, conforming to the consensus GNRA, UNCG or CUNG, where R represents either A or G nucleotides, and N can be any nucleotide. A rho-independent transcription terminator is often found that overlaps the c4 antisense RNA structure. Although RNAs often overlap transcription terminators to regulate transcription abundance, the information known about c4 antisense RNAs suggest that their terminator is more likely to be constitutive. Later bioinformatics work uncovered an additional set of RNAs called ("c4-2" RNAs) that appear to function as c4 antisense RNAs, but have a somewhat altered secondary structure.

A conserved RNA structure adopted by the a1, b1 site was identified and called the "c4-a1b1" motif. This structure overlaps an earlier family of predicted RNAs called IsrK, which was identified among numerous RNA molecules that bind to the Hfq protein, a protein that mediates many antisense RNA interactions. Later work on IsrK showed that its transcription was increased during late stationary phase of growth, or when cells are grown with low amounts of either oxygen or magnesium. It is unknown how this expression pattern might relate to the phage biology.
