= 1993 Summer Offensives =

Battles of the First Nagorno-Karabakh War

- Part of the First Nagorno-Karabakh War
Date	June–October 1993
Location	Agdam, Fuzuli, Jabrayil, Qubadli and Zangilan districts, Azerbaijan
Result	Armenian victory

Belligerents
Armenia; Nagorno-Karabakh Republic	(Azerbaijan Democratic Republic) Azerbaijan; Hezb-e-Islami

The 1993 Summer Offensives of the First Nagorno-Karabakh War saw the capture of several Azerbaijani regions by Armenian military units in a series of battles from June to October 1993.

== Offensive ==
In the summer of 1993, Agdam District became a scene for exchange of artillery from both sides. On July 4, an artillery bombardment was commenced by the Armenian forces against the city of Agdam. As the civilians began to evacuate the city, so did the soldiers. As house to house fighting took place, the Azerbaijanis made little effort to defend the town. Within the end of the month, the Armenian forces had taken hold of Aghdam, and an estimated 120,000 Azerbaijani civilians had fled the region. On July 29, the second UNSC resolution, 853, was passed condemning the offensive and reaffirming the previous points it had made. Despite calls to halt their advances, the Armenian government stated that they had no control over the enclave's military leaders in order to call off the offensive.

Facing a military collapse, Aliyev attempted to mediate with the de facto Nagorno-Karabakh government and Minsk Group officials. A three-day truce was agreed upon by both governments beginning on July 26. Within days, as a sight that had become all too familiar for both, the cease fire collapsed and both sides resumed their fighting. In mid-August, the Armenians massed a force to take Fuzuli and Jabrayil, south of NKAO proper, and within Azerbaijan's control. Azerbaijan charged that the Armenian forces had already begun bombarding the villages while the Armenians denied it, claiming that they were "defending the southern border of the enclave from the Azerbaijani attacks." In either case, the Armenian forces crossed south and advanced south towards the border of Iran towards Fuzuli. Supported by heavy armour, they pushed their way through the region as Iran's government issued several warnings on the new offensive but also said it would recommit itself to new peace talks. The region was populated by 30–50,000 Azerbaijanis, forcing many of them to flee and seek refuge in Iran. In August 23, Jabrayil had fallen. It was followed by successively Fuzuli on 25 August 1993, Qubadli on 31 August 1993 and Zangilan on 29 October 1993. Consequently, Armenian-occupied territories surrounding Nagorno-Karabakh were formed.

Afghan Mujahideen from Hezb-e-Islami took part in the offensive on Azerbaijan's side.
