= Channel 4 virtual TV stations in Canada =

The following television stations operate on virtual channel 4 in Canada:

- CBAT-DT in Fredericton, New Brunswick
- CBOT-DT in Ottawa, Ontario
- CFCM-DT in Quebec City, Quebec
- CFCN-DT in Calgary, Alberta
- CFRS-DT in Saguenay, Quebec
- CFSK-DT in Saskatoon, Saskatchewan
- CFTF-DT-4 in Forestville, Quebec
- CHAU-DT-7 in Rivière-au-Renard, Quebec
- CHFD-DT in Thunder Bay, Ontario
- CIII-DT-4 in Owen Sound, Ontario
- CIMT-DT-1 in Edmundston, New Brunswick
- CITL-DT in Lloydminster, Alberta/Saskatchewan
- CKRN-DT in Rouyn-Noranda, Quebec
