= Individually ventilated cage =

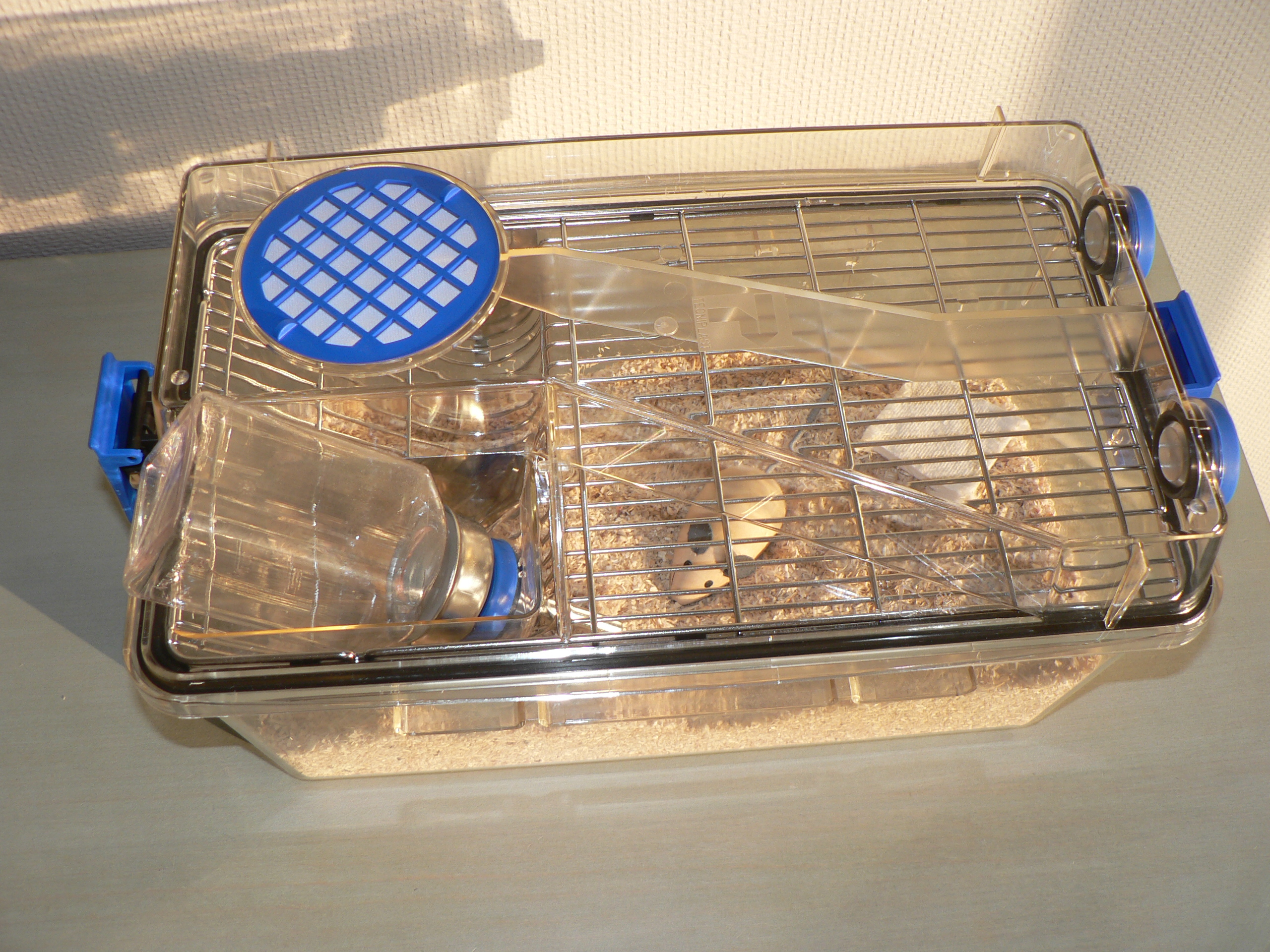
Individual ventilated cage (with wooden mouse)

An individually ventilated cage (IVC) is used to keep an animal separated from other animals and possible exposures, including exposure by air.

== Use ==
In laboratory animal husbandry, there is a huge demand for animals that have been kept in disease free conditions and housed in barrier units such as individually ventilated cages. This is very important because when animals are used for scientific research, particularly drug-related research, the animals must provide accurate and valid results. Using an animal that is ill may cause the severity limit to be exceeded. If the animal already has a disease and then undergoes experimentation of a substance that also produces effects on the animals health, it could potentially worsen the effects of the agent being tested causing the animal to experience more suffering than necessary. The animals may produce false results which may prove vital at a later stage, e.g., in drug trials on humans. Not only that, the experiment will have to be performed again and the previous animals would have ended up being killed. Special caging systems are often used alongside many other barriers to keep unwanted materials out of range of the animals.

== IVC system ==
=== General ===
The IVC-systems in which the animals are kept in ensures they are fully protected by use of HEPA-filters (high efficiency-particulate air) that defends them from all micro-organisms. A process of sterilisation of all items to be passed in to the barrier unit including bedding material, food etc. must be performed.

The cages are usually made out of high tech special synthetic polycarbonates. Although this material allows various methods of sterilising and disinfecting to be carried out, repeated sterilisation can cause discolouration and brittleness.

=== Design ===
The cages are constructed and designed in a specific way to ensure an absolute microparticle free inner environment. This generally includes a cage bottom, a cage top (with a food hopper and water bottle holder incorporated) and a filter lid. It is also designed to allow maximum comfort of the animal and to provide a secure, chew proof environment. An external ventilation unit supplies the cages with fresh HEPA-filtered air which passes through the filter lids. The ventilation-system mostly consists of two tubes for ingoing and outgoing air.

=== Criticism ===
Individual cages, with no environmental enrichment, make it impossible for any animal to carry out species-specific behaviour and are a huge drawback in the terms of animal welfare. In natural conditions, many animals live in groups, but individual cages prevent that. However, that said, multiple sizes of IVCs are available for holding either 1–5 animals or in larger cages 12–15 per cage.
