= Community Catholic Church of Canada =

Independent Catholic denomination

The Community Catholic Church of Canada (CCCC), is an Independent Old Catholic denomination with its episcopal see based in Niagara-on-the-Lake, Ontario. The church was established in 1960 as the Old Catholic Church of Canada.

The current presiding bishop is the Deborah Vaughan. The previous presiding bishop was Pat Davies.
