= Channel 4 TV stations in Canada =

The following television stations broadcast on digital or analog channel 4 in Canada:

- CFJC-TV in Kamloops, British Columbia
- CFTF-DT-4 in Forestville, Quebec
- CHAU-DT-7 in Rivière-au-Renard, Quebec
- CHFD-DT in Thunder Bay, Ontario
- CIMT-DT-1 in Edmundston, New Brunswick

== Defunct ==
- CFRN-TV-9 in Slave Lake, Alberta
- CHEX-TV-1 in Bancroft, Ontario
- CITL-DT in Lloydminster, Alberta/Saskatchewan
- CITO-TV-3 in Hearst, Ontario
- CJCB-TV in Sydney, Nova Scotia
- CKEM-TV-1 in Red Deer, Alberta
- CKYB-TV in Brandon, Manitoba
