= C4 =

C4, C04, C.IV, C-4, or C-04 often refers to the explosive. It may also refer to:

== Arts, entertainment, and media ==
=== Music ===
- C4 (American band), a neo-classical metal band set up by Michael Angelo Batio
- C4 (French band), French boyband
- C4 (mixtape), by American rapper Kendrick Lamar
- C_{4}, scientific pitch notation for the note "Middle C" (261.626 Hz)
- C4 Records, a record label

=== Other uses in arts, entertainment and media ===
- C4 (New Zealand TV channel), a former New Zealand television music channel
- 1. c4, also called the English Opening, a chess opening
- Channel 4, British TV channel abbreviated "C4"

== Organizations ==
- C4 (Colombia), a political party in Colombia
- C4, a social welfare non-profit entity organized under section 501(c)(4) of the U.S. Internal Revenue Code
- Churches Covered and Connected in Covenant, a religious association founded by Archbishop LeRoy Bailey Jr.
- Craiova Group, a cooperation project of four European states

== People ==
- C4 (rapper), a rap music producer from Birmingham, England
- Clarence Mitchell IV, American radio host and former politician
- Chris Turner, sometimes credited as Chris Heiner, a.k.a. "C4", Australian musician, part of Modern Day Poets

== Places ==
- Caldwell 4 or NGC 7023 or Iris Nebula, a reflection nebula in the constellation Cepheus
- Circumferential Road 4 or C-4, an arterial road of Manila, Philippines
- Ken-Ō Expressway, a road in Japan (includes some sections of Shin-Shōnan Bypass)
- Omote-sandō Station, a Tokyo Metro subway station (station number: C-04)
- Wadi C-4, designation for the Tomb of Thutmose II

== Science, technology, and mathematics ==
=== Biology ===
- C4, an EEG electrode site according to the 10-20 system
- Apolipoprotein C4, a protein encoded by the APOC4 gene
- c4 antisense RNA, a non-coding RNA
- ATC code C04 Peripheral vasodilators, a subgroup of the Anatomical Therapeutic Chemical Classification System
- C_{4} carbon fixation, a pathway for carbon fixation in photosynthesis that produces C4 plants
- Cervical spinal nerve 4, a nerve originating in the neck
- Cervical vertebra 4, one of the cervical vertebrae of the vertebral column
- C04, oral cancer ICD-10 code
- Complement component 4, a protein involved in the intricate complement system, encoded by C4A or C4B gene in humans
- C_{4} fragments, one of the types of products of catabolism pathways

=== Computing ===
- C4 (conference), a Macintosh software developers conference
- C4 Engine, a next-generation 3D game engine
- C4 model, a graphical notation technique for diagramming software architecture
- Cx4 chip, an add-on microprocessor chip employed by certain Super NES game cartridges (often incorrectly referred to as the C4 chip)
- Controlled collapse chip connection or flip chip, a method for interconnecting semiconductor devices
- VIA C4, a planned design of central processing unit for a personal computer

=== Mathematics ===
- $C_4$, the cyclic group of order 4
- C4, the fourth pure "core" module in the Edexcel A-level mathematics examination

=== Weapons ===
- C-4 (explosive), a type of plastic explosive
- Hafdasa C-4, an Argentine submachine gun

=== Other uses in science and technology ===
- C-4 (explosive), a high explosive solid
- C4, butyl-type hydrocarbon chain, a type of four-carbon molecule, especially in C4 reversed-phase chromatography columns
- Cluster 4, an ESA satellite that studies the Earth's magnetosphere over the course of an entire solar cycle
- C-4 Protective Mask, standard issue gas mask of the Canadian Armed Forces

== Sports ==
- C4 (classification), a Paralympic cycling classification
- C-4, professional wrestler Paul Burchill's name for his finishing move, a moonsault uranage
- A four-man Sprint Canoe; see Canoe racing, abbreviated "C4"
- The UEFA Intertoto Cup, a football competition (abbreviation "C4" mainly used in non-English speaking countries)
- C4 level, a challenge square dance program at the Challenge 4 level
- 1. c4, or the English Opening, a chess opening

== Stationery ==
- C4, an international standard paper size (229 × 324 mm), defined in ISO 216
- C4, the envelope size matching the A4 paper size

== Vehicles ==
=== Aircraft ===
- C-4, the US Army designation of the Ford Trimotor
- AEG C.IV, a German World War I reconnaissance aircraft
- AGO C.IV, a 1917 German reconnaissance aircraft
- C-4 Academe, the military version of Gulfstream I twin turboprop business aircraft
- C-4 Argonaut, a Canadair aircraft derived from the Douglas DC-4
- Cierva C.4, a 1922 Spanish experimental autogyro
- DFW C.IV, a 1916 German reconnaissance aircraft
- Flight Design C4, a four-seat light aircraft
- Fokker C.IV, a 1923 Dutch two-seat reconnaissance aircraft
- Rumpler C.IV, a 1917 German single-engine, two-seater reconnaissance biplane

=== Automobiles ===
- C4, a class of Audi 100 and Audi A6 cars
- Chevrolet Corvette (C4), the fourth production design of the Chevrolet Corvette
- Citroën C4, a car made by Citroën
- Coloni C4, a Formula One car built by Enzo Coloni Racing Car Systems
- Sauber C4, a Sauber sportscar
- Spyker C4, a Spyker car

=== Locomotives ===
- Bavarian C IV, an 1884 German steam locomotive
- GS&WR Class C4, a Great Southern and Western Railway Irish steam locomotive
- LNER Class C4, a class of British steam locomotives

=== Ships ===
- HMS C4, a C-class submarine of the British Royal Navy
- Spanish submarine C-4, a C-class submarine of the Spanish Navy
- Type C4 ship, merchant cargo ships of US Maritime Commission "C" design
- USS C-4 (SS-15), a C-class submarine of the US Navy
- USS Philadelphia (C-4), a protected cruiser of the US Navy

=== Vehicle components ===
- Ford C4 transmission, an automatic transmission
- Menasco C4, a 1930s 4-cylinder, air-cooled, in-line, inverted, aero-engine

== Other uses ==
- C4, a variation of Command and control, meaning "Command, Control, Communications and Computers"
- C4, the monogram of Christian IV of Denmark, used in the city arms of Kristianstad, Sweden since 1622
- C4 Extreme, a sports nutrition supplement product line by Cellucor, which includes C4 energy drinks

== See also ==
- 4C (disambiguation)
- CCCC (disambiguation)
- CIV (disambiguation)
