= Interactive video compositing =

Interactive video compositing, or IVC, is an interactive media production technique that uses pre-rendered videos and images to create visual coherence, allowing interactive environments to be created without the heavy processing load incurred by real-time 3D graphics.

The most popular examples of IVC are in video games using the technique prior to the propagation of real-time 3D graphics. On the Internet, some websites (generally in Adobe Flash) make use of this technique for visual rendering with other effects.

The differences with interactive video compositing, as opposed to real-time graphics, lies in the finality of the product. IVC is used with the goal of creating an enriched interactive experience from a product's constituent media in a simple manner.

== Notable video games using IVC ==
- The 7th Guest
- Myst
- Versailles 1685
