= Krunk UAV =

American unmanned aircraft

Krunk
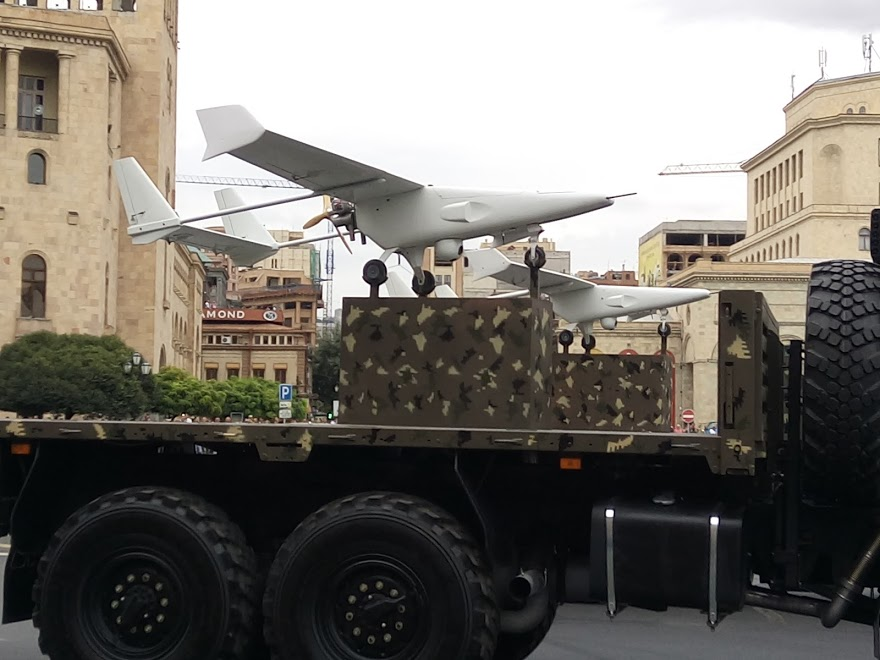

General information
- Type: Unmanned aerial vehicle
- National origin: Armenia
- Manufacturer: Armenian Armed Forces
- Status: In service
- Primary users: Armed Forces of Armenia Artsakh Defense Army

History
- Introduction date: 2011
- First flight: 2011

Krunk (Armenian: Կռունկ; 'crane') is an Armenian unmanned aerial vehicle (UAV) in service with the Armed Forces of Armenia. It is intended for close reconnaissance, transmitting real-time video data (visual or infrared) or taking higher resolution still images.The Krunk was demonstrated for the first time on September 21, 2011 during a military parade dedicated to the 20th anniversary of the independence of Armenia.

The name refers to range of different models. Latest ones are Krunk-9 and Krunk-11.

== Specifications ==
- Crew: 0 (unmanned)
- Capacity: 60 kg (132 lb)
- Max speed kmh: 150 km/h (82 knots, 95 mph)
- Endurance: 5 hours
- Ceiling: 4500 m (13,150 ft)
- Max ceiling: 5400 m (15,770 ft)
- Length: 3.8 m (12 ft) (5 m (16 ft) with the wings spread out)

== Service ==
- Armenia - Armed Forces of Armenia
- Artsakh - Artsakh Defense Army

== See also ==
Category: Unmanned aerial vehicles of Armenia
