= WMDF-LD =

Television station in Miami

- Miami, Florida; United States
- Channels: Digital: 4 (VHF); Virtual: 3

Programming
- Affiliations: see § Subchannels

Ownership
- Owner: Joseph Lassiter; (Everclear Network, LLC)

History
- Founded: February 3, 2006
- First air date: 2006
- Former call signs: W69EI (2003–2006); WGAY-LP (2006–2009); WMDF-LP (2009–2012)
- Former channel numbers: Analog: 41 (UHF, 2006–2012); Digital: 4 (VHF, 2012–2014)

Technical information
- Licensing authority: FCC
- Facility ID: 130544
- Class: LD
- ERP: 5.7 kW
- HAAT: 194.1 m (637 ft)
- Transmitter coordinates: 25°46′20.4″N 80°11′29.2″W

Links
- Public license information: LMS

WMDF-LD (channel 3) is a low-power television station in Miami, Florida, United States. The station is owned by Leonard Slazinski.

== History ==
Proud Television logo, 2006–2008.

The station originally gained a permit on 2003, under the name W69EI, originally licensed to Key West, Florida. The station was originally signed on by Paradise TV in 2006 as WGAY-LP. It aired programming catering to the LGBT community (mostly from PrideNation Network of Palm Springs, California), with a selection of original programming and specials, plus movies about or appealing to LGBT culture. Shows included a cartoon known as G-Force Unite, talk show OUTspoken, and a cooking show, The Kenji and Bella Show, featuring a drag queen and a Chilean chef. Paradise TV, owned by the Sherwood family, got the idea after Burt Sherwood, a former NBC News executive and broker of low-power TV station permits, saw that a channel 69 permit for Key West was available; by the time it was on air, the station had been reallocated to channel 41.

However, due to economic troubles, Proud Television closed down sometime in 2008. PrideNation would sell the station to Three Grand TV of Altamonte Springs, which would re-call the station as WMDF-LP.

In January 2012, the station converted to a digital license, as WMDF-LD.

In April 2012, the station would be transferred to Paradise TV of Sarasota, retaining Three Grand TV as a licensee.

== Subchannels ==
The station's signal is multiplexed:

Subchannels of WMDF-LD
Subchannel	Res.	Short name	Programming
4.1	480i	WMDF-1	Main WMDF-LD programming (4:3)
4.2	480i	WMDF-2	Infomercials (4:3)
4.3	480i	WMDF-LD	[Blank]
4.4	480i	WMDF-LD	[Blank]
