= Splash of color =

In filmmaking, the term splash of color refers to the effect of the use of a colored item on an otherwise monochrome image to draw extra attention to the item. It has been used frequently in films as a form of emphasis. Some commercials will film a portion in black and white, except the product which appears in color.

A stark use of this technique occurred in the Steven Spielberg film Schindler's List, in which the entire film is done in black-and-white, except for a little girl's red coat.
