= KRDO =

KRDO may refer to:

- KRDO-FM, a radio station (105.5 FM) licensed to Security, Colorado, United States
- KRDO (AM), a radio station (1240 AM) licensed to Colorado Springs, Colorado, United States
- KRDO-TV, a television station (channel 13, remapped from 24) licensed to Colorado Springs, Colorado, United States
