= KATC =

KATC may refer to:

- KATC-FM, a radio station (95.1 FM) licensed to Colorado Springs, Colorado, United States
- KATC (TV), a television station (channel 3) licensed to Lafayette, Louisiana, United States
- Kasisi Agricultural Training Centre, farming school near Lusaka, Zambia
- Korea Army Training Center, a military training center located in Nonsan, South Chungcheong Province, South Korea
