= ABC 8 =

ABC 8 may refer to one of the following television stations in the US affiliated with the American Broadcasting Company:

== Current affiliates ==
- KAIT in Jonesboro, Arkansas
- KGNS-DT2 in Laredo, Texas
- KIFI-TV in Idaho Falls, Idaho
- KJCT-LP in Grand Junction/Montrose, Colorado
- KJUD in Juneau, Alaska
- KLKN in Lincoln, Nebraska
- KNOE-DT2 in Monroe, Louisiana
- KOLO-TV in Reno, Nevada
- KSBW-DT2 in Salinas–Monterey–Santa Cruz, California
- KTUL-TV in Tulsa, Oklahoma
- WCHS-TV in Charleston–Huntington, West Virginia
- WDAZ-TV in Devils Lake–Grand Forks, North Dakota
  - Semi-satellite of WDAY-TV in Fargo, North Dakota
- WFAA-TV in Dallas–Fort Worth, Texas
- WGTQ in Sault Ste. Marie, Michigan
  - Full satellite of WGTU in Traverse City, Michigan
- WMTW in Poland Spring–Portland, Maine
- WQAD-TV in Moline, Illinois (Quad Cities)
- WRIC-TV in Petersburg–Richmond, Virginia
- WTNH in New Haven–Hartford, Connecticut

== Formerly affiliated ==
- KFWU (now KQSL) in Fort Bragg, California (1990–1997)
  - Was a satellite of KRCR-TV in Redding, California
- KGW-TV in Portland, Oregon (1956–1959)
- KJCT (now KLML) in Grand Junction, Colorado (1979–2014)
- KKTU/KDEV in Cheyenne, Wyoming (branded as ABC 8 from 2003–2006 and again in 2008)
- KGHL-TV/KPAX-TV in Missoula, Montana (1970–1991; secondary from 1970–1976 and 1984–1991)
- KOMU-TV in Columbia–Jefferson City, Missouri (secondary from 1953–1971, then primarily from 1982–1985)
- KULR-TV in Billings, Montana (1963–1987)
- KVIJ-TV in Sayre, Oklahoma (1976–1992):
  - Was a satellite of KVII-TV in Amarillo, Texas
- WGHP in High Point–Greensboro–Winston-Salem, North Carolina (1963–1995)
- WISH-TV in Indianapolis, Indiana (1954–1956)
- WSIX (now WKRN-TV) in Nashville, Tennessee (1953–1973)
- WSLA (now WAKA) in Montgomery, Alabama (1960–1968)
- WSVI in Christiansted, U.S. Virgin Islands (1965–2015)
- WTVH (now WHOI) in Peoria, Illinois (1953–1963)
- WVUE-TV in New Orleans, Louisiana (1970–1995)
