= KJCT =

KJCT may refer to:

- KJCT-CD, a low-power television station (channel 20/PSIP 8) licensed to Grand Junction, Colorado, United States
- KLML, a television station (channel 7/PSIP 20) licensed to Grand Junction, Colorado, United States, which used the call sign KJCT from 1979 to 2014
