= KTLO-LD =

Television station in Colorado Springs, Colorado

- Colorado Springs, Colorado; United States
- Channels: Digital: 29 (UHF); Virtual: 46
- Branding: Telemundo Colorado Springs-Pueblo; Notialertas (news)

Programming
- Affiliations: 46.1: Telemundo

Ownership
- Owner: News-Press & Gazette Company; (Pikes Peak Television, Inc.)
- Sister stations: TV: KRDO-TV; Radio: KRDO, KRDO-FM

History
- First air date: October 4, 1988
- Former call signs: K49CJ (1988–2008); KTLO-LP (2008–2022)
- Former channel numbers: Analog: 49 (UHF, 1990–2022); Digital: 46 (UHF, until 2020)
- Call sign meaning: Telemundo

Technical information
- Licensing authority: FCC
- Facility ID: 64981
- Class: LD
- ERP: 14 kW; 15 kW (CP)
- HAAT: −224.6 m (−737 ft); 618.7 m (2,030 ft) (CP)
- Transmitter coordinates: 38°49′43″N 104°50′22″W; 38°44′44.9″N 104°51′41.9″W (CP)
- Translator(s): KRDO-TV 13.2 Colorado Springs

Links
- Public license information: LMS
- Website: www.krdo.com/telemundo

KTLO-LD (channel 46) is a low-power television station in Colorado Springs, Colorado, United States, affiliated with the Spanish-language network Telemundo. It is owned by the News-Press & Gazette Company (NPG) alongside ABC affiliate KRDO-TV (channel 13) and radio stations KRDO (1240 AM) and KRDO-FM (105.5). The four stations share studios on South 8th Street in Colorado Springs, where KTLO-LD's transmitter is also located.

Due to its low-power status, KTLO-LD's broadcast range only covers the immediate Colorado Springs area. Therefore, it is simulcast in 720p high definition on KRDO-TV's second digital subchannel in order to reach the entire market. This signal can be seen on channel 13.2 from a transmitter on Cheyenne Mountain.

== Subchannel ==
Subchannel of KTLO-LD
Subchannel	Res.	Short name	Programming
46.1	720p	KTLO-LD	Telemundo
