= KKPK =

Radio station in Colorado Springs, Colorado

Coordinates: 38.746°N 104.862°W

- Colorado Springs, Colorado; United States
- Broadcast area: Colorado Springs-Pueblo-Denver
- Frequency: 92.9 MHz
- Branding: 92.9 Peak FM

Programming
- Format: Adult contemporary

Ownership
- Owner: Cumulus Media; (Radio License Holding CBC, LLC)
- Sister stations: KATC, KCSF, KKFM, KKMG, KVOR

History
- First air date: February 1, 1960
- Former call signs: KVOR-FM (1960–1974); KSPZ (1974–2006)
- Call sign meaning: Colorado (K) Peak

Technical information
- Licensing authority: FCC
- Facility ID: 62038
- Class: C
- ERP: 60,000 watts
- HAAT: 670 meters (2198 ft)

Links
- Public license information: Public file; LMS
- Webcast: Listen Live
- Website: 929peakfm.com

KKPK (92.9 MHz "92.9 Peak FM") is a commercial FM radio station licensed to Colorado Springs, Colorado and serving the Colorado Springs and Pueblo metropolitan areas. It is owned by Cumulus Media and airs an adult contemporary music radio format with a variety hits element. Peak FM is known for its community involvement, assisting charitable organizations with such promotions as the "Peak FM Pantry Raid." It carries the syndicated "John Tesh Intelligence for Your Life" program at night.

KKPK's studios and offices are in the Cumulus Colorado Springs complex on Corporate Drive. Its transmitter is located southwest of Colorado Springs, near Cheyenne Mountain State Park.

== History of 92.9 ==
On February 1, 1960, KVOR-FM first signed on, simulcasting its sister station, KVOR (then at 1300 AM). The two stations aired a middle of the road format of popular music, news and sports, as a CBS Radio News network affiliate.

In 1974, the station changed its call sign to KSPZ and adopted the moniker Z93, broadcasting a Contemporary Hits Format (CHR) on FM using Century 21's Z Format, but dropped the service in 1978 in favor of a live and local approach. Z93 later evolved into an adult contemporary format (AC) using programming provided by Transtar Radio Networks which was based in Colorado Springs at the time. In early 1990, KSPZ flipped to an oldies format and took on the moniker "Oldies 92.9." KSPZ's oldies format evolved to classic hits in the fall of 2005, concentrating on hits from the 1970s and 1980s, while dropping most 1950s and early 1960s titles. KKPK has modified its playlist in recent years to playlist focused on gold titles from the 80s, 90s, and recent hits that have tested well in the overall AC format.

In June 2006, locally owned Pikes Peak Broadcasting sold KRDO-FM ("The Peak”), to Citadel Broadcasting, which changed the station to "Cat Country 95.1" (KATC-FM). Citadel Broadcasting moved "The Peak" moniker and AC format to the 92.9 frequency soon thereafter. On October 5, 2006, KSPZ became "The New Peak FM," adopting the call letters KKPK. The new format combined the classic hits of the 1970s and 1980s with current and recent adult titles. The announcement of the new station was made by the morning show hosts at 9:29 a.m. (for its 92.9 dial position) on the top of Pikes Peak.

Citadel merged with Cumulus Media on September 16, 2011.

== History of 95.1 ==
The station that today is KKPK has some history with the 95.1 frequency. That station began in 1969 as beautiful music outlet KRDO-FM (but not related to today's news/talk station KRDO-FM on 105.5 MHz). As many easy listening stations, KRDO-FM evolved into an adult contemporary format but tried to salvage the Easy Listening format up until 1994 while other stations embraced AC in the 1980's. The station began using the moniker "95.1 The Peak." When Citadel Broadcasting switched 95.1 to country music outlet KATC-FM in 2006, it moved the AC format and "Peak" moniker to 92.9, taking the call letters KKPK. For additional history of 95.1, see KATC-FM.
