= Badger Mountain =

Badger Mountain may refer to the following in the United States:

- Badger Mountain (Colorado)
- Badger Mountain (Douglas County, Washington)
- Badger Mountain (Benton County, Washington)
