= KJCT-CD =

Television station in Grand Junction, Colorado

- Grand Junction, Colorado; United States
- Channels: Digital: 20 (UHF); Virtual: 8
- Branding: KJCT 8; KJCT News 8

Programming
- Affiliations: 8.1: ABC; 8.2: Laff; 8.3: Ion

Ownership
- Owner: E. W. Scripps Company; (ION Television License, LLC)
- Sister stations: KKCO

History
- Founded: August 16, 2005
- First air date: December 17, 2006
- Former call signs: K20IN (2005–2006); KKHD-LP (2006–2015); KJCT-LP (2015–2025)
- Former affiliations: Telemundo (2006–2014)
- Call sign meaning: Grand Junction

Technical information
- Licensing authority: FCC
- Facility ID: 128473
- Class: CD
- ERP: 15 kW
- HAAT: 922 m (3,025 ft)
- Transmitter coordinates: 39°2′54.9″N 108°15′8.2″W
- Translator(s): K28AD-D Montrose

Links
- Public license information: Public file; LMS
- Website: www.kjct8.com

KJCT-CD (channel 8) is a low-power, Class A television station in Grand Junction, Colorado, United States, serving Colorado's Western Slope region as an affiliate of ABC. Owned by the E. W. Scripps Company, it is a sister station to dual NBC/Telemundo affiliate KKCO (channel 11). The two stations share studios on Blichmann Avenue in Grand Junction; KJCT-CD's transmitter is located at the Mesa Point Electronics Site on the Grand Mesa (southeast of I-70).

KJCT-CD's signal is relayed on K28AD-D in Montrose, which has operated from Storm King Mountain since it launched in September 1982, along with digital translators across central and northwestern Colorado.

== History ==
=== Intellectual unit ===
The KJCT-LP intellectual unit originated on October 22, 1979, when KJCT (channel 8) signed on as the first television station in Western Colorado since KREX-TV (channel 5) in 1954. It was owned by the Pikes Peak Broadcasting Company as a semi-satellite of fellow ABC affiliate KRDO-TV in Colorado Springs. Before KJCT's sign-on, all three major networks had been shoehorned on KREX-TV. However, cable viewers could watch the full ABC schedule on Denver's KBTV (channel 9, now NBC affiliate KUSA).

The station had full production facilities in Grand Junction; however, much of the programming was fed via hundreds of miles of microwave links from KRDO. In the late 1990s, KJCT chief engineer Roger Hightower modernized KJCT into one of the first true digital facilities in Colorado, and severed the electronic umbilical cord with KRDO.

KJCT was the first Western Colorado television station with modern electronic news gathering technology. "8 Live," the station's first live microwave newsvan, came into service in 1984.

In 2006, News-Press & Gazette Company announced the purchase of KJCT along with KRDO-TV and KRDO radio from Pikes Peak Broadcasting.

In late 2008, KJCT's third digital subcarrier became western Colorado's affiliate for The CW. However, despite The CW being available locally, Denver's KWGN-TV, which has been on cable for decades in Grand Junction, is still available through two low-powered repeaters in the area.

On August 2, 2013, News Press & Gazette announced the sale of KJCT's license assets to Excalibur Broadcasting and its non-license assets to Gray Television; Excalibur is owned by former Gray executive, Don Ray. Gray planned to operate the station through joint sales and shared services agreements, making KJCT a sister station to KKCO. The sale was completed on October 31. This was NPG's first broadcast divestiture since the sale of its original group of five stations to New Vision Television in 1993.

In the wake of the Federal Communications Commission (FCC)'s increased scrutiny towards virtual duopolies, Gray announced that it would move KJCT's programming to a subchannel of KKCO, and sell KJCT to a minority owned broadcaster, which will operate the station autonomously from KKCO or any other broadcaster. On August 27, 2014, Gray announced that it would sell KJCT to Jeff Chang and Gabriela Gomez-Chang, owner of KQSL. The new owners would change KJCT's call letters to KGBY. On October 21, 2014, the FCC approved a swap of virtual channels between KJCT/KGBY and a co-owned low-power station in Grand Junction, KKHD-LP (channel 20), that Gray was in the process of acquiring; as a result, KGBY, following the sale, maps to virtual channel 20, while KKHD inherited virtual channel 8, as well as KJCT's ABC programming. The swap is intended to reduce viewer confusion that would otherwise result from a move of ABC programming. The sale of the original KJCT's license assets was completed on December 15.

On July 7, 2025, it was announced that, in an exchange of several stations between Gray Media and the E. W. Scripps Company, KJCT-LP and KKCO would be traded to Scripps. The FCC approved the multi-market exchange on April 28, 2026.

=== License ===
The current license for KJCT-LP originated on August 16, 2005, when the FCC granted a construction permit to Paul Varecha for a low-power television station on channel 20; the station was originally issued the call sign K20IN, but changed to KKHD-LP on April 3, 2006. The station filed for its license to cover the permit on September 1, 2006 and was granted it on December 17. That October, Varecha sold KKHD, which had affiliated with Telemundo, and KXHD-LP (channel 36) in Montrose to News-Press and Gazette Company for $675,000; the deal was completed on January 2, 2007. KXHD was previously K07IU (channel 7), a translator for Fox affiliate KFQX (channel 4), which moved to channel 36 (as K36HJ) in March 2006 after being displaced by the digital signal of eventual sister station KJCT; shortly thereafter, Varecha bought K36HJ from Professional Antenna, Tower and Translator Service for $15,000 and changed its call letters to KXHD-LP. On April 26, 2010, KKHD was granted a construction permit to flash cut to digital.

KKHD-LP and KXHD-LP (the latter of which had joined KKHD in carrying Telemundo programming) were included in Excalibur Broadcasting's 2013 purchase of KJCT from NPG. In June 2014, Excalibur reached a deal to sell KKHD and KXHD to Gray outright for $2.5 million; the purchase was completed on December 15. KKHD changed its call letters to KJCT-LP on January 9, 2015; this followed the move of the original KJCT's virtual channel 8 and its programming (including ABC) to the station.

== News operation ==
KJCT presently broadcasts 17 hours of locally produced newscasts each week (with three hours each weekday and one hour each on Saturdays and Sundays). Most of the newscasts are simulcast on sister station KKCO.

On May 22, 2009, KJCT became the first station in Grand Junction to launch local news in high definition. The station debuted a new set in May 2011, to coincide with a new graphics package. In July 2011, KJCT overtook its competitors to become the top rated station in the coveted 25-54 demographic in all weekday newscasts.

=== Notable former on-air staff ===
- Kristin Fisher
- John Gurtler – sports anchor
- Michelle Tuzee – anchor/reporter

== Subchannels ==
The station's signal is multiplexed:

Subchannels of KJCT-CD
| Subchannel | Res. | Short name | Programming |
|---|---|---|---|
| 8.1 | 720p | ABC | ABC |
| 8.2 | 480i | Laff | Laff |
| 8.3 | 480i | ION | ION |

== Translators ==
- K34KM-D Basalt
- K28JY-D Carbondale
- K22LR-D Collbran
- K35CH-D Cortez, Mancos, etc.
- K23NX-D Gateway
- K31OH-D Mesa
- K21JK-D Montrose
- K28AD-D Montrose
- K32OL-D Redstone
- K34LC-D Rifle, etc.
- K25MR-D Snowmass Village
- K10PR-D Thomasville

== See also ==
- Channel 8 virtual TV stations in the United States
- Channel 13 branded TV stations in the United States
- Channel 20 low-power TV stations in the United States
