= KGBY =

KGBY may refer to:

- KGBY-LD, a television station (channel 10) licensed to serve Palm Springs, California, United States; see List of television stations in California
- KLML, a television station (channel 7, virtual 20) licensed to serve Grand Junction, Colorado, United States, which held the call sign KGBY from 2014 to 2020
- KLML-LD, a low-power television station (channel 36, virtual 20) licensed to serve Grand Junction, Colorado, which held the call sign KGBY-LD in 2020
- The former call sign of KBEB, Sacramento, California (1991-2011)
