= KSKX =

KSKX may refer to:

- KSKX (FM), a defunct radio station (89.5 FM) formerly licensed to serve Chemult, Oregon, United States
- Taos Regional Airport (ICAO code KSKX)
- KRDO-FM, a Colorado radio station using call sign KSKX from 1996 to 2006
