= Channel 8 virtual TV stations in the United States =

The following television stations operate on virtual channel 8 in the United States:

- K02JG-D in Prospect, Oregon
- K02JJ-D in Williams, Oregon
- K03DP-D in Scobey, Montana
- K03DS-D in Ruth, Nevada
- K03FB-D in Snowflake, etc., Arizona
- K03IA-D in Sula, Montana
- K03IL-D in Bullhead City, Arizona
- K05AF-D in Mina/Luning, Nevada
- K05BE-D in Lehmi, etc., Idaho
- K05GM-D in Plains-Paradise, Montana
- K05ND-D in Long Valley Junction, Utah
- K06AA-D in Broadus, Montana
- K06DM-D in Panaca, Nevada
- K06FE-D in Miles City, Montana
- K06HN-D in Gunnison, Colorado
- K07FL-D in Thompson Falls, Montana
- K07NU-D in White Sulphur Spring, Montana
- K07PA-D in Manitou Springs, Colorado
- K07PB-D in Thayne, etc., Wyoming
- K08HU-D in Aleknagik, Alaska
- K08KD-D in Alakanuk, Alaska
- K08KO-D in Cooper Landing, Alaska
- K08LL-D in Dolores, Colorado
- K08LS-D in Elko, Nevada
- K08MB-D in Weber Canyon, Colorado
- K08NQ-D in Ryndon, Nevada
- K08OU-D in Seattle, Washington
- K08OZ-D in Trout Creek, etc., Montana
- K08PI-D in Salmon, Idaho
- K08QE-D in Fergus Falls, Minnesota
- K08QL-D in Logan, Utah
- K08QM-D in Wendover, Utah
- K09FJ-D in Pioche, Nevada
- K09FK-D in Ursine, Nevada
- K09FL-D in Caliente, Nevada
- K09OY-D in Colstrip, Montana
- K09SD-D in Lehmi, etc., Idaho
- K10AC-D in Ashland, Montana
- K10PR-D in Thomasville, Colorado
- K10PS-D in Pine Ridge, South Dakota
- K10QJ-D in Mink Creek, Idaho
- K10QZ-D in Rosebud, etc., Montana
- K11FF-D in Superior, Montana
- K11HO-D on Polson, Montana
- K11IL-D in Bitterroot Range, etc., Montana
- K12LO-D in Ferndale, Montana
- K13BE-D in Harlowton, Montana
- K13OC-D in Douglas, etc., Alaska
- K13PE-D in Shady Grove, Oregon
- K13PF-D in Pinehurst, Oregon
- K13PI-D in Ruch & Applegate, Oregon
- K13PO-D in Hysham, Montana
- K13RD-D in Collbran, Colorado
- K13RV-D in Leadore, Idaho
- K13ZS-D in Sargents, Colorado
- K13AAF-D in Monticello/Blanding, Utah
- K14KK-D in Flagstaff, Arizona
- K14RV-D in Forsyth, Montana
- K15ED-D in Waunita Hot Springs, Colorado
- K15GL-D in Trinidad/Valdez, etc., Colorado
- K15IM-D in Brookings, etc., Oregon
- K15IZ-D in Edgemont, South Dakota
- K15KR-D in Poplar, Montana
- K15ME-D in Salmon, Idaho
- K16EX-D in Clovis, New Mexico
- K16FU-D in Mina/Luning, Nevada
- K16IX-D in Preston, Idaho
- K16ML-D in Corvallis, Oregon
- K17HA-D in Astoria, Oregon
- K17JS-D in Philipsburg, Montana
- K17KC-D in Meeteetse, Wyoming
- K17MB-D in Circleville, Utah
- K17MQ-D in Thompson Falls, Montana
- K17NJ-D in Rockaway Beach, Oregon
- K17NT-D in Ely & McGill, Nevada
- K18IP-D in Overton, Nevada
- K19CX-D in Yuma, Arizona
- K19HS-D in Grants Pass, Oregon
- K19IS-D in Inyokern, California
- K19KN-D in Eads, etc., Colorado
- K19KU-D in Walla Walla, Washington
- K19LT-D in Prineville, etc., Oregon
- K20JW-D in Jacks Cabin, Colorado
- K20KL-D in Drummond, Montana
- K20KU-D in Montpelier, Idaho
- K20ML-D in Parks, etc., Arizona
- K20OC-D in El Dorado, Arkansas
- K21HQ-D in Glendo, Wyoming
- K21JC-D in Pocatello, Idaho
- K21JK-D in Montrose, Colorado
- K21KI-D in Hatch, Utah
- K21MA-D in Emigrant, Montana
- K22DR-D in Laughlin, Nevada
- K22GM-D in Battle Mountain, Nevada
- K22IK-D in Rexburg, etc., Idaho
- K22IM-D in Challis, Idaho
- K22IQ-D in Cave Junction, Oregon
- K22KS-D in Libby, Montana
- K22LR-D in Collbran, Colorado
- K22MG-D in Woods Bay, Montana
- K22MH-D in Logan, Utah
- K22MW-D in Panguitch, Utah
- K22MX-D in Henrieville, Utah
- K22NQ-D in Holbrook, Idaho
- K23JH-D in Leadore, Idaho
- K23NJ-D in Prescott, etc., Arizona
- K23NK-D in Orderville, Utah
- K23NT-D in Mayfield, Utah
- K23NX-D in Gateway, Colorado
- K23OK-D in Walker Lake, Nevada
- K24BY-D in Pahrump, Nevada
- K24FL-D in Columbus, Montana
- K24GY-D in Ely, Nevada
- K24HU-D in Burley, etc., Idaho
- K24IB-D in Verdi/Mogul, Nevada
- K24KX-D in Cedarville, California
- K24ON-D in Ridgecrest, California
- K25KS-D in The Dalles, Oregon
- K25MR-D in Snowmass Village, Colorado
- K25OT-D in Susanville, etc., California
- K25OV-D in Cody, Wyoming
- K25PD-D in Parowan/Enoch/Paragonah, Utah
- K25PF-D in Delta, Oak City, etc, Utah
- K25PX-D in Lund & Preston, Nevada
- K25PY-D in Leadore, Idaho
- K26FV-D in La Grande, Oregon
- K26GG-D in Golconda, Nevada
- K26KG-D in Beowawe, Nevada
- K26OS-D in Sapinero, Colorado
- K26OX-D in Colstrip, Montana
- K27JZ-D in Round Mountain, Nevada
- K27KP-D in Driggs, Idaho
- K27KW-D in Gold Hill, etc., Oregon
- K27NN-D in Eureka, Nevada
- K27NR-D in Topock, Arizona
- K28AD-D in Montrose, Colorado
- K28JY-D in Carbondale, Colorado
- K28MJ-D in Tillamook, Oregon
- K28NY-D in La Grande, Oregon
- K28PL-D in Roseau, Minnesota
- K28PX-D in Stead, Nevada
- K28QC-D in Imlay, Nevada
- K29AZ-D in Newport, Oregon
- K29FS-D in Wolf Point, Montana
- K29HG-D in Jackson, Wyoming
- K29HM-D in Lake George, Colorado
- K29JL-D in Las Animas, Colorado
- K29LG-D in Soda Springs, Idaho
- K29NG-D in Crested Butte, Colorado
- K30FS-D in Hawthorne, Nevada
- K30GM-D in Capitan/Ruidoso, New Mexico
- K30OI-D in Camp Verde, Arizona
- K30PI-D in Garrison, Utah
- K30PR-D in Pahrump, Nevada
- K30PX-D in Winnemucca, Nevada
- K30PY-D in Parlin, Colorado
- K31GJ-D in Alamogordo, New Mexico
- K31GZ-D in Lake Havasu City, Arizona
- K31IX-D in Salida, Colorado
- K31LG-D in Emery, Utah
- K31NI-D in Lamar, Colorado
- K31NV-D in Globe-Miami, Arizona
- K31NW-D in Forsyth, Montana
- K31OH-D in Mesa, Colorado
- K31PY-D in Roundup, Montana
- K32CQ-D in Shurz, Nevada
- K32IK-D in San Luis Valley, Colorado
- K32KC-D in Montpelier, Idaho
- K32NB-D in Beaver etc., Utah
- K32NQ-D in Salmon, Idaho
- K32NT-D in Crested Butte, Colorado
- K32OL-D in Redstone, Colorado
- K33IM-D in Malad City, Idaho
- K33IW-D in Coaldale, Colorado
- K33MC-D in Forsyth, Montana
- K33NX-D in Carlsbad, New Mexico
- K33OD-D in Kingman, Arizona
- K34CB-D in Lehmi, etc., Idaho
- K34DJ-D in Phoenix, etc., Oregon
- K34KE-D in Hood River, Oregon
- K34KM-D in Basalt, Colorado
- K34MF-D in Orovada, Nevada
- K34NC-D in Fish Creek, etc., Idaho
- K34NL-D in Sargents, Colorado
- K34OB-D in Howard, Montana
- K34OP-D in Kanab, Utah
- K35CH-D in Cortez/Mancos, etc., Colorado
- K35HU-D in Grays River, Washington
- K35JW-D in Bridger, etc., Montana
- K35JZ-D in Alton, Utah
- K35MU-D in Cottonwood, etc., Arizona
- K35OI-D in Starr Valley, Nevada
- K35OM-D in La Veta, Colorado
- K35OO-D in Del Norte, Colorado
- K35OQ-D in San Luis, Colorado
- K35OR-D in Aguilar, Colorado
- K36DP-D in Pendleton, Oregon
- K36FZ-D in Meadview, Arizona
- K36JD-D in Jackson, Wyoming
- K36JO-D in Cheyenne, Wyoming
- K36NP-D in Baker Valley, Oregon
- K36OJ-D in Rainier, Oregon
- K36OM-D in Tropic, Utah
- K36ON-D in Escalante, Utah
- K36OO-D in Boulder, Utah
- K36OP-D in Hanksville, Utah
- K36OQ-D in Caineville, Utah
- K36PN-D in Beowawe, Nevada
- KAET in Phoenix, Arizona
- KAIT in Jonesboro, Arkansas
- KBNI-LD in Santa Maria, California
- KBTV-CD in Sacramento, California
- KCCI in Des Moines, Iowa
- KCSG in Cedar City, Utah
- KCSG-LD in Ogden, Utah
- KESD-TV in Brookings, South Dakota
- KFLA-LD in Los Angeles, California
- KFMB-TV in San Diego, California
- KGNS-TV in Laredo, Texas
- KGW in Portland, Oregon
- KGWZ-LD in Portland, Oregon
- KIAT-LD in Jonesboro, Arkansas
- KIFI-TV in Idaho Falls, Idaho
- KILA-LD in Cherry Valley, California
- KJCT-LP in Grand Junction, Colorado
- KJUD in Juneau, Alaska
- KKDJ-CD in Visalia, California
- KLAO-LD in Corpus Christi, Texas
- KLAS-TV in Las Vegas, Nevada
- KLKN in Lincoln, Nebraska
- KLST in San Angelo, Texas
- KMTI-LD in Manti and Ephraim, Utah
- KNOE-TV in Monroe, Louisiana
- KOBR in Roswell, New Mexico
- KOLO-TV in Reno, Nevada
- KOMU-TV in Columbia, Missouri
- KPAX-TV in Missoula, Montana
- KPSW-LD in Boise, Idaho
- KPTS in Hutchinson, Kansas
- KQSL in Cloverdale, California
- KRFT-LD in Springfield, Missouri
- KSBW in Salinas, California
- KSNK in McCook, Nebraska
- KSVC-LD in Marysvale, Utah
- KSYS in Medford, Oregon
- KTLD-CD in Bakersfield, California
- KTSC in Pueblo, Colorado
- KTTA-LD in Monroe, Utah
- KTUL in Tulsa, Oklahoma
- KUAM-TV in Hagåtña, Guam
- KUCB-LD in Dutch Harbor, Alaska
- KUHT in Houston, Texas
- KULR-TV in Billings, Montana
- KUMV-TV in Williston, North Dakota
- KVFR-LD in Redding, California
- KVPS-LD in Indio, California
- KWYP-DT in Laramie, Wyoming
- KXMP-LD in Harrison, Arkansas
- KZDF-LD in Santa Barbara, California
- KZSD-TV in Martin, South Dakota
- W02AU-D in St. Francis, Maine
- W08EH-D in Ponce, Puerto Rico
- W08EI-D in Guaynabo, Puerto Rico
- W08EJ-D in Anasco, Puerto Rico
- W08EQ-D in Tallahassee, Florida
- W09DJ-D in Wilkes-Barre, etc., Pennsylvania
- W12DI-D in Key West, Florida
- W18EU-D in Miami, Florida
- W21EF-D in Waupaca, Wisconsin
- W28EW-D in Toccoa, Georgia
- WAGM-TV in Presque Isle, Maine
- WAKA in Selma, Alabama
- WAUG-LD in Raleigh, North Carolina
- WBDL-LD in Elk Mound, Wisconsin
- WCHS-TV in Charleston, West Virginia
- WDAZ-TV in Devil's Lake, North Dakota
- WDHS in Iron Mountain, Michigan
- WDSE in Duluth, Minnesota
- WFAA in Dallas, Texas
- WFIG-LD in Charlotte Amalie, U.S. Virgin Islands
- WFLA-TV in Tampa, Florida
- WGAL in Lancaster, Pennsylvania
- WGEN-LD in Miami, Florida
- WGEN-TV in Key West, Florida
- WGHP in High Point, North Carolina
- WGSC-CD in Murrells Inlet, South Carolina
- WGTQ in Sault Ste. Marie, Michigan
- WGTV in Athens, Georgia
- WHCQ-LD in Cleveland, Mississippi
- WILC-CD in Sugar Grove, Illinois
- WISH-TV in Indianapolis, Indiana
- WJW in Cleveland, Ohio
- WKBT-DT in La Crosse, Wisconsin
- WLIO in Lima, Ohio
- WMTW in Poland Spring, Maine
- WNCE-CD in Glens Falls, New York
- WNFT-LD in Gainesville, Florida
- WNPT in Nashville, Tennessee
- WOFT-LD in Ocala, Florida
- WOOD-TV in Grand Rapids, Michigan
- WPDR-LD in Tomah, Wisconsin
- WPSJ-CD in Hammonton, New Jersey
- WQAD-TV in Moline, Illinois
- WRIC-TV in Petersburg, Virginia
- WROC-TV in Rochester, New York
- WRUA in Fajardo, Puerto Rico
- WSIU-TV in Carbondale, Illinois
- WSVI in Christiansted, U.S. Virgin Islands
- WTNH in New Haven, Connecticut
- WVFW-LD in Miami, Florida
- WVLT-TV in Knoxville, Tennessee
- WVMY-LD in Parkersburg, West Virginia
- WVUE-DT in New Orleans, Louisiana
- WWCP-TV in Johnstown, Pennsylvania
- WXGA-TV in Waycross, Georgia
- WYCN-LD in Providence, Rhode Island
- WZCK-LD in Madison, Wisconsin

The following stations, which are no longer licensed, formerly operated on virtual channel 8:

- K05FR-D in Crowley Lake, California
- K06KO-D in Kanarraville, etc., Utah
- K08AX-D in Ardenvoir, Washington
- K08BA-D in Orondo, etc., Washington
- K08ID-D in Tuluksak, Alaska
- K08JZ-D in Waunita Hot Springs, Colorado
- K08NP-D in John Day, Oregon
- K12QO-D in Aspen, Colorado
- K34LC-D in Rifle, etc., Colorado
- K36AF-D in New Castle, Colorado
- K36HV-D in Wallowa, Oregon
- K38FO-D in Carbondale, Colorado
- K41GI-D in Imlay, Nevada
- K42EV-D in Glenwood Springs, Colorado
- K45AF-D in Parachute, etc., Colorado
- W08ED-D in Marathon, Florida
- W11AY-D in St. John Plantation, Maine
- W21CL-D in Marathon, Florida
- WFXI in Morehead City, North Carolina
