= KCNC-TV =

Television station in Denver

- Denver, Colorado; United States
- Channels: Digital: 35 (UHF); Virtual: 4
- Branding: CBS Colorado; CBS News Colorado

Programming
- Affiliations: 4.1: CBS; for others, see § Subchannels

Ownership
- Owner: CBS Television Stations; (CBS Television Stations Inc.)

History
- First air date: December 24, 1953
- Former call signs: KOA-TV (1953–1983)
- Former channel numbers: Analog: 4 (VHF, 1953–2009)
- Former affiliations: NBC (1953–1995)
- Call sign meaning: "Colorado's News Channel"

Technical information
- Licensing authority: FCC
- Facility ID: 47903
- ERP: 1,000 kW
- HAAT: 374 m (1,227 ft)
- Transmitter coordinates: 39°43′50.6″N 105°13′55.6″W
- Translator(s): see § Translators

Links
- Public license information: Public file; LMS
- Website: www.cbsnews.com/colorado/

KCNC-TV (channel 4), branded CBS Colorado, is a television station in Denver, Colorado, United States. It is owned and operated by the CBS television network through its CBS Television Stations division, and maintains studios on Lincoln Street (between East 10th and 11th Avenues) in downtown Denver; its transmitter is based on Lookout Mountain, near Golden.

== History ==
=== NBC affiliate (1953–1995) ===
The station first signed on the air at 6:30 p.m. on December 24, 1953, as KOA-TV. The station aired an inaugural program followed by the Christmas feature The Lamb and the Manger. Founded by Metropolitan TV Company (partly owned by famed comedian Bob Hope, and not to be confused with a similarly named company later known as Metromedia), owners of KOA radio (850 AM), channel 4 immediately assumed the NBC affiliation from KBTV (channel 9, now KUSA), due to KOA radio's longtime affiliation with and ownership by the NBC Red Network.

In 1965, KOA-TV began carrying most of NBC's American Football League game telecasts as the network obtained the league's broadcast television rights (with play-by-play announcing duties handled by Curt Gowdy); however, Denver Broncos home games aired by the network had to be blacked out due to the team's inability to sell out tickets to the games (NFL blackout rules in effect at the time required teams to sell all tickets for home games in order to allow them to be broadcast in the team's primary market; the league later lowered the designated sales threshold to allow home game broadcasts to 75% of all tickets, and as of 2015, the blackout rules have been lifted indefinitely), this partnership continues to this day with CBS (with exception of a hiatus from the second week of the 1995 season to end of the 1997 season, when most games moved to KUSA in that interim period). In 1967, KOA-TV ran an award-winning documentary The Acid Test, LSD; hosted by news editor Bob Palmer, the film took five months to produce with more than 5,000 feet of film shot. Photographers involved included Bill Baker, Medill Barnes, Allan Bisset, Jerry Curran, Sam Houston and Barry Trader.

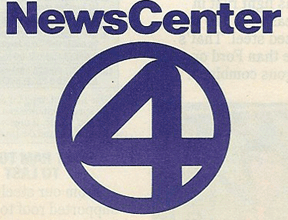
KOA-TV, which switched from logo to logo in the 1970s, stuck with this "circle 4" logo from 1981 to 1993, long after it became KCNC-TV

In 1968, Metropolitan TV Company sold KOA, KOA-FM 103.5, and KOA-TV to General Electric (GE) for $10 million. GE sold the radio stations–KOA and what had become KOAQ–to A. H. Belo Corporation in 1983 for $22 million, as part of the company's overall exit from broadcasting. GE retained channel 4, but was required by FCC regulations at the time—which forbade TV and radio stations in the same city, but with different owners from sharing the same call letters—to change the station's call letters to KCNC-TV (standing for "Colorado's News Channel"), which it officially adopted on August 12 of that year.

In 1986, General Electric acquired NBC, resulting in GE's return to broadcasting and KCNC becoming the first owned-and-operated station of a major network in the state of Colorado. In 1987, control of the station has been transferred from GE itself to NBC, becoming a proper O&O. By 1990, KCNC-TV devoted nearly all of its programming hours outside of network shows to locally produced news programs, broadcasting nearly 40 hours of newscasts each week. General manager Roger Ogden felt his station's money was better spent on local programming, rather than paying syndication distributors to acquire nationally syndicated shows. In 1990, KCNC paid $11,000 to the market's PBS member station KRMA-TV (channel 6) to carry the station's election coverage (using KCNC's reporters), in order to allow channel 4 to air NBC's Tuesday night lineup, including Matlock and In the Heat of the Night.

By early 1995, KCNC-TV was airing 41 hours of news a week, and the station programmed either local-interest programming or newscasts at times when NBC did not have network programming, because the station did not buy syndicated programming. This ended almost as soon as Group W/CBS took over after the affiliation switch.

=== CBS switch and ownership (1995–present) ===
On July 14, 1994, CBS and Westinghouse Electric Corporation agreed to a long-term affiliation deal that would result in three of Westinghouse's television stations (longtime ABC affiliate WJZ-TV in Baltimore and longtime NBC stations KYW-TV in Philadelphia and WBZ-TV in Boston) becoming CBS affiliates, joining the company's two longtime CBS affiliates (KDKA-TV in Pittsburgh and KPIX in San Francisco). The deal initially called for CBS to sell its owned-and-operated Philadelphia station WCAU; however, CBS later discovered that if it sold WCAU in order to affiliate with KYW-TV, it would have had to pay hefty capital gains taxes on the profit of the transaction. To alleviate this problem, in November 1994, NBC decided to swap ownership of KCNC-TV and KUTV in Salt Lake City (which NBC had acquired the month before), along with the VHF channel 4 allocation and transmitter in Miami to CBS in exchange for WCAU and the VHF channel 6 allocation and transmitter in Miami, which for legal purposes made the deal an even trade.

KCNC-TV became Denver's CBS affiliate at 12:07 a.m. on September 10, 1995, after a rerun of Saturday Night Live ended, as part of a three-way affiliation swap involving each of the market's "Big Three" network affiliates. Longtime CBS affiliate KMGH-TV (channel 7) switched its affiliation to ABC through a multi-station affiliation agreement with KMGH's owners at the time, McGraw-Hill; while longtime ABC affiliate KUSA took the NBC affiliation through a multi-station affiliation agreement with the Gannett Company, which itself was spurred by the initial affiliation deal that was reached between New World Communications and Fox. (Gannett had already owned several NBC affiliates at the time, as is the case in the present day with successor company Tegna Inc.) Under the terms of the CBS/Westinghouse deal, CBS a sold controlling ownership interest (55%) in KCNC to Westinghouse's broadcasting division Group W. The previous month on August 1, Westinghouse had acquired CBS for $5.4 billion; once the merger was finalized on November 24, 1995, KCNC-TV became a CBS-owned-and-operated station, making it one of a handful of television stations that have been owned by two different networks at separate points in its history. As of 2025, KCNC, along with CW outlet KWGN-TV (through its owner Nexstar Media Group) are the only television stations in the Denver market that are owned-and-operated stations of one of the five major English language broadcast networks (concurrent to the CBS-Westinghouse merger, Fox had acquired KDVR (channel 31), which it would eventually sell to Local TV in 2008; it is now owned by Nexstar Media Group alongside KWGN-TV).

The station was featured in the 2007 film Blades of Glory; along with other Denver area stations, it has also been mentioned on the Colorado-set Comedy Central series South Park. In one episode, Ron Zappolo is referenced as still being with channel 4 (although at the time, Zappolo served as evening anchor at KDVR).

KCNC became the last of the "big 3" stations in Denver to start a digital subchannel, launching Decades on January 23, 2015. On July 24, 2018, CBS and Weigel Broadcasting announced the creation of the Start TV subchannel which launched on September 3, 2018.

In March 2023, the station rebranded as "CBS Colorado", as part of a rebranding of all of the CBS owned-and-operated stations. At that time the newscasts were rebranded as CBS News Colorado, which was already the name of KCNC-TV's streaming news service.

== Programming ==
As an owned-and-operated station, KCNC-TV clears the entire CBS network schedule; however, it is one of the few CBS stations that airs the CBS Weekend News (the Saturday and Sunday editions of the CBS Evening News) a half-hour earlier than most affiliates due to its hour-long 5 p.m. newscast (aligning it with the program's recommended timeslot in the Central Time Zone) and CBS Saturday Morning (the Saturday edition of CBS Mornings) two hours earlier than most CBS stations (aligning it with the program's recommended timeslot in the Eastern Time Zone).

=== Sports programming ===
In 1998, CBS acquired the broadcast rights to the American Football Conference of the National Football League (which absorbed the AFL and the Broncos in 1970), moving the conference's game telecasts to the network from NBC (and with it, from KUSA, which aired most games between the second week of the 1995 season to the end of the 1997 regular season [and Super Bowl XXXII in January 1998, which the Broncos won]); as a result, KCNC regained the local television rights to the Broncos (coinciding with the season in which the team won its second straight Super Bowl championship and fan favorite John Elway played his final season with the Broncos before his retirement from the NFL). Ironically, KCNC would later carry the Broncos' win in Super Bowl 50, the last game of quarterback Peyton Manning before he retired.

As an NBC affiliate, KCNC aired any Denver Nuggets basketball contests through the NBA on NBC beginning in 1990 until the station's 1995 disaffiliation with the network.

=== News operation ===
The logo for CBS News Colorado

KCNC-TV presently broadcasts 39 hours, 55 minutes of locally produced newscasts each week (with 6 hours, 35 minutes on Mondays through Thursdays; 6 hours, 5 minutes on Fridays; and 3 1/2 hours each on Saturdays and Sundays); in addition, the station produces the public affairs program Together with Karen Leigh (which airs every Friday at 6:30 p.m., with a rebroadcast on Sunday mornings at 7:30 a.m.) and sports highlight/discussion programs Saturday Sports Extra (which airs during the final 13 minutes of the Saturday 10 p.m. newscast) and AutoNation All Access (which airs after the Sunday 10 p.m. newscast).

In 1969, Bob Palmer, who served as anchor of the 10 p.m. newscast, left channel 4 for KLZ-TV (now KMGH-TV), to replace John Rayburn, who left for an anchor job at a station in Kansas City. In the 1970s, the station ran its late evening newscasts on weekends at 11 p.m. (one hour later than the typical late news timeslot in the Mountain Time Zone). In 1981, KBTV news director Roger Ogden was hired by KOA-TV as its general manager; during his tenure, Ogden hired Marv Rockford and John Haralson, who had both worked alongside Ogden at channel 9, to join the station's news staff. Ogden named George Caldwell, Sam Allred and Ron Zappolo as its main anchor team. Janet Zappala and Alan Berg joined the station as well that year. In 1983, Marv Rockford was promoted to the news director position; while Peter Rogot was named the station's weekend anchor and Marty Aarons joined Bob Palmer and Janet Zappala as anchors; other staffers that joined channel 4 during 1983 included Wendy Bergen, Karen Layton, Marcia Neville, Tom Raponi and Mike Silva.

In 1982, KMGH-TV anchor Bill Stuart left to join KOA-TV, joining several other new hires such as Linda Farrell, Sylvia Cordy, Jeff Hullinger, Steve Anderson, Stephanie White, Merrie Lynn, Tom Martino and Tom Baer. That June, KOA-TV debuted a half-hour 4:30 p.m. newscast titled First News, which was co-anchored by Larry Green and Linda Farrell, with Suzanne McCarroll as the featured reporter on the new show; the program would eventually expand to an hour-long broadcast beginning at 4 p.m., and remained on the station until it was canceled on May 26, 2006, in order to air The Oprah Winfrey Show in the timeslot. Also that year, the station's news helicopter ("Copter 4") crashed into a snowy stand of pine trees near Larkspur, while en route to the crash site of a commuter airplane, killing KOA-TV pilot/reporter Karen Key (who was the first female pilot of a news helicopter in the country) and mechanic Larry Zane; autopsy results later reported that Key had a blood alcohol content at the time of the crash at 0.09 (just below the legal limit of 0.10).

On the evening of June 18, 1984, Alan Berg—an attorney who hosted programs on both KOA radio and KOA-TV and was known for taking a largely liberal stand on issues, using an abrasive and combative demeanor to callers and guests with opposing views at times—was shot and killed in the driveway of his home by members of a White Nationalist group called The Order. The incident was adapted into Steven Dietz's 1988 play God's Country and the 1988 film Betrayed, as well as the film Brotherhood of Murder (1999). Oliver Stone's 1988 film of Eric Bogosian's play Talk Radio drew inspiration from Berg's plight.

In 2002, Marv Rockford was forced out as general manager of KCNC and replaced by Walt DeHaven. Meanwhile, Tony Lopez moved from San Antonio to join channel 4. In 2003, Molly Hughes and Bill Stuart served as KCNC's primary evening news team for its 10 p.m. newscast, with Brian Maass and Rick Sallinger as reporters. On April 21, 2008, Karen Leigh (who previously worked at Minneapolis sister station WCCO-TV) replaced Molly Hughes as co-anchor of the weeknight newscasts. KCNC also began broadcasting its local newscasts in high definition on that date, becoming the second television station in the Denver market (after KUSA) to make the conversion and the market's third station to broadcast all of its programming, including syndicated programs, in the format (behind KUSA and its sister station KTVD (channel 20)).

The 4 p.m. newscast returned to the schedule on June 13, 2011, only lasting less than three months before it was dropped a second time after the September 2, 2011, broadcast and replaced three days later by Dr. Phil. On February 3, 2013, KCNC debuted a "Mobile Weather Lab", a technologically equipped Chevrolet Suburban (which is retrofitted for off-road use and is primarily used during the weekday morning newscasts; and the equipped-based model was manufactured by General Motors-owned Chevrolet) that is used for storm tracking and is equipped with a weather station that provides live data. On January 13, 2014, KCNC expanded its weekday morning newscast to 2 1/2 hours, with the addition of a half-hour at 4:30 a.m. The second generation "Mobile Weather Lab" debuted in 2018 including on-board weather station with custom display.

KCNC-TV launched a streaming news service, CBSN Denver (now CBS News Colorado) on February 19, 2020, as part of a rollout of similar services (each a localized version of the national CBSN service) across the CBS-owned stations.

KCNC re-added an hour-long 4 p.m. newscast on weekdays on September 12, 2022.

=== Notable former on-air staff ===
- Carlos Amezcua – news anchor
- Alan Berg – KOA radio and TV talk show host
- Wendy Bergen – reporter
- David Crabtree – anchor/reporter (1991–1994)
- John Ferrugia – anchor/investigative reporter (1989–1992)
- Chris Fowler – sports reporter
- Morris Jones – midday anchor
- Philip J. LeBeau – general assignment reporter
- Tom Martino – consumer reporter (1982–1999)
- Reynelda Muse – first woman and first African American to anchor a television news program in Colorado
- Les Shapiro – sports anchor

== Technical information ==
=== Subchannels ===
The station's signal is multiplexed:

Subchannels of KCNC-TV
Channel	Res.	Short name	Programming
4.1	1080i	KCNC-TV	CBS
4.2	480i	StartTV	Start TV
4.3	480i	Dabl	Dabl
4.4	480i	MeTV	MeTV (KREG-TV)
4.5	480i	Catchy	Catchy Comedy
4.6	480i	Story	Story Television

Simulcast of subchannels of another station

=== Analog-to-digital conversion ===
KCNC-TV ended regular programming on its analog signal, over VHF channel 4, on June 12, 2009, the official date on which full-power television stations in the United States transitioned from analog to digital broadcasts under federal mandate. The station's digital signal remained on its pre-transition UHF channel 35, using virtual channel 4.

As part of the SAFER Act, KCNC kept its analog signal on the air until July 12 to inform viewers of the digital television transition through a loop of public service announcements from the National Association of Broadcasters.

=== Translators ===
- K20NI-D Akron
- K17KX-D Akron
- K35GO-D Haxtun
- K19EG-D Holyoke
- K25GZ-D Holyoke
- K16EK-D Idalia
- K16ET-D Pleasant Valley
- K17NH-D Sterling
- K32AB-D Yuma

== See also ==
- KOA (AM)
