= KCSF =

- Colorado Springs, Colorado; United States
- Broadcast area: Colorado Springs, Colorado
- Frequency: 1300 kHz (HD Radio)
- Branding: Xtra Sports Radio 1300

Programming
- Format: Sports
- Affiliations: BetMGM Network; Westwood One Sports; Fox Sports Radio; Colorado Avalanche; Denver Nuggets; Colorado Springs Switchbacks FC

Ownership
- Owner: Cumulus Media; (Radio License HoldingSports CBC, LLC)
- Sister stations: KATC-FM; KKFM; KKMG; KKPK; KVOR

History
- First air date: September 22, 1922 (as KFUM)
- Former call signs: KFUM (1922–1931); KVOR (1931–2000); KTWK (2000); KUBL (2000–2002); KBZC (2002–2004); KKML (2004–2008)
- Call sign meaning: "Colorado Sports Frequency"

Technical information
- Licensing authority: FCC
- Facility ID: 62039
- Class: B
- Power: 5,000 watts day; 1,000 watts night
- Transmitter coordinates: 38°48′46″N 104°48′52.9″W

Links
- Public license information: Public file; LMS
- Webcast: Listen live
- Website: www.xtrasports1300.com

KCSF (1300 AM, "Xtra Sports 1300") is a radio station serving the Colorado Springs area with a sports format. It is under ownership of Cumulus Media.

The station features Westwood One Sports, as well as Dan Patrick from Fox Sports Radio, Denver Nuggets, Colorado Avalanche, and Colorado Springs Switchbacks FC.

== History ==
=== Early years ===
On September 22, 1922, Colorado Springs' first commercial radio station, KFUM ("Known For Unsurpassed Mountain scenery"), was licensed. Its call sign changed to KVOR ("Voice of the Rockies") when the station was purchased by the Reynolds Radio Co., founded by Denver radio pioneer Dr. William "Doc" Reynolds. As of 1933, the studio and transmitter were both located at the Mining Exchange Building.

During the Golden Age of Radio, KVOR was a CBS affiliate, airing its schedule of dramas, comedies, news, sports, soap operas, game shows and big band broadcasts. It broadcast on 1270 kHz, at 1,000 watts of power, with studios in the Antlers Hotel. In the 1940s, it moved to 1300 kHz. In 1960, it added an FM sister station, KVOR-FM (now KKPK), simulcasting the AM station's programming. In 1968, KVOR received permission from the Federal Communications Commission to boost its daytime power to 5,000 watts.

=== Middle of the road ===
In the 1960s, as network programming shifted to television, KVOR switched to a middle of the road format of popular music, news and sports, still as a CBS affiliate. By the 1980s, as music listening switched to FM, KVOR began adding talk programming to its line up, using NBC's Talknet service at night.

=== Switch to talk ===
By 1984, KVOR had completed the switch to all-talk programming, with its FM station moving to an adult contemporary music format as KSPZ, "Z93". KVOR picked up talk shows from the ABC TalkRadio network and added ABC Radio News, replacing CBS as its network.

In 1996, KVOR and KSPZ (now KKPK) were acquired by Triathlon Broadcasting of Colorado Springs, which also owned KVUU and KSSS (later KTWK). During this time, advertising time on these stations was controlled by Citadel Broadcasting through a local marketing agreement (LMA), while the actual broadcast operations were under the control of Triathlon.

=== Citadel Broadcasting ownership ===
In 1999, Citadel Broadcasting fully acquired KVOR, KSPZ and KTWK by exchanging KKLI with Triathlon (now merged with iHeartMedia, Inc.), thus ending the LMA.

In March 2000, KVOR switched frequencies with then-KTWK on AM 740.

The format became Classic country in December 2000, when the station changed calls to KUBL (standing for 'The Bull').

The station adopted a progressive talk format in 2002, and adopted the call letters KBZC, calling itself 'The Buzz 1300'.

=== Switch to sports ===
In 2004, the format changed again to a sports radio format, calling itself "Sports Animal 1300" and adopting the call letters KKML. The station signed on as an affiliate of Fox Sports Radio then signed on with ESPN Radio in 2007.

=== Return to classic country ===
In July 2008, Citadel Broadcasting abandoned the sports format in favor of a 'Classic Country' format as "KCS 1300 AM" to complement its sister Mainstream Country station KATC-FM and to pay homage to the former "KCS Country" station (see KCS History). This format change also brought Don Imus into the Colorado Springs Market, and used Jones Radio Networks Classic Country Satellite Programming as its lineup. The Jones format was changed in mid-2009 to Citadel Media's in-house Real Country format, featuring a mix of classic country and country currents.

=== Return to sports/Cumulus ownership ===
The most recent change of 1300's format back to sports radio took effect on November 5, 2009, with returning 'Sports Animal 1300' to Colorado Springs. Citadel merged with Cumulus Media on September 16, 2011.

== KCS history ==
KKCS-FM went on the air in Colorado Springs on September 12, 1979, broadcasting a country music format. The station was known as "The Most Country KCS 102". KKCS remained a major competitor in the market for country until purchased by Bustos Media in 2005.

After being purchased, KKCS moved frequencies from 101.9 FM to 104.5 FM (taking that frequency from Canon City, Colorado country station KSTY). With the 104.5 transmitter being located in Canon City, the signal of KCS was severely limited to Colorado Springs. In 2006, the station let go of all personnel and played all music before going dark in 2007. The country format on that frequency has since returned to Canon City with KSTY.
