= KKFM =

Radio station in Colorado Springs, Colorado

Colorado Springs, Colorado; United States
- Broadcast area: Colorado Springs, Colorado; Pueblo, Colorado
- Frequency: 98.1 MHz
- Branding: Classic Rock 98.1 KKFM

Programming
- Language: English
- Format: Classic rock
- Affiliations: Westwood One

Ownership
- Owner: Cumulus Media; (Radio License Holding CBC, LLC)
- Sister stations: KATC, KCSF, KKMG, KKPK, KVOR

History
- First air date: May 2, 1959; 65 years ago (on 96.5)
- Former frequencies: 96.5 MHz (1959–1992)

Technical information
- Licensing authority: FCC
- Facility ID: 11237
- Class: C
- ERP: 71,000 watts
- HAAT: 698 meters (2,290 ft)
- Transmitter coordinates: 38°44′36″N 104°51′46″W

Links
- Public license information: Public file; LMS
- Webcast: Listen live
- Website: www.kkfm.com

KKFM (98.1 FM) is a radio station licensed to Colorado Springs, Colorado. It airs a classic rock format and is owned by Cumulus Media.

KKFM first signed on in 1959 and originally broadcast on 96.5 MHz. In 1986, KKFM changed format from contemporary hit radio to playing "Colorado Classics" (including album-oriented rock). It switched frequency to 98.1 MHz at 5:30 a.m. on September 14, 1992, allowing two new stations to sign on: KBIQ (now KIBT) 96.1 in Colorado Springs, and KXPK 96.5 in Denver.

KKFM features The Bob & Tom Show mornings. The station competes for the rock audience with active rock KILO 94.3, alternative KRXP 103.9, and active rock KBPL 107.9 in the Colorado Springs-Pueblo area.
