= Marc Brown (journalist) =

American journalist (born 1961)

- Born: Marc Alan Brown; September 29, 1961 (age 64); Los Angeles, California, U.S.
- Education: Narbonne High School(Class of 1979); University of Southern California
- Occupation: Television journalist
- Years active: 1984–present
- Employer(s): KIEM-TV; KOLO-TV; KNTV; KFMB-TV; KABC-TV (1989–present)

Marc Alan Brown (born September 29, 1961) is an American television news anchor at KABC-TV in Los Angeles. Brown co-anchors the station's Eyewitness News HD newscasts at 5 p.m. and 11 p.m. Brown has earned four Emmy Awards, a Golden Mike, an Associated Press and a Radio and Television News Director Association award.

Brown graduated from Narbonne High School (Class of 1979) in Los Angeles's Harbor City neighborhood and earned Bachelor of Arts degrees in Broadcast Journalism and Political Science from the University of Southern California. His first television job was as a reporter at KIEM-TV in Eureka, California in 1984. He went on to report and anchor at KOLO-TV in Reno, Nevada, KNTV in San Jose, California and KFMB-TV in San Diego, California before returning to Los Angeles to begin working at KABC-TV in 1989 as a reporter. He later was named weekend anchor and by 1996, he was given anchoring duties on the weekday 6 p.m. newscast. The following year his anchoring duties were broadened to include the station's 4 p.m. newscast and in 2000, he was named anchor of the weeknight 11 pm newscast. He became the second African-American to become the primary anchor of an 11 p.m. weeknight newscast in Los Angeles. In August 2007, he, along with co-anchor Michelle Tuzee were moved to the 5 p.m. newscast, in addition to the anchoring of the 11 p.m. program.
