= Wendy Bergen =

Television journalist

- Born: Wendy Anne Bergen; January 3, 1956; Greenwich, Connecticut, United States
- Died: April 26, 2017 (aged 61)
- Education: University of Utah
- Occupations: Writer, journalist

Wendy Anne Bergen (January 3, 1956 – April 26, 2017) was an American television journalist.

Bergen was raised in Greenwich, Connecticut, and graduated from the University of Utah. She began her television career as a weather reporter in Lake Placid, New York.

In 1983, Bergen joined KCNC-TV and became a star reporter for the station.

In 2017, Bergen died of a brain aneurysm.

== Blood Sport ==
In the spring of 1990, Bergen made a documentary called Blood Sport where she claimed there was an underground network of pitbulls involved in dogfighting in Denver. But she secretly staged dogfights to make footage for the documentary. Debra Saunders of the San Francisco Chronicle was one of the first journalists to question her account alongside Rocky Mountain News. Bergen was pressured to resign on September 6, 1990, when her deception was discovered. She was later found guilty of staging dogfighting but not for perjury. She later had to pay a $20,000 fine.
