= Les Shapiro =

American sportscaster (1956–2022)

- Born: March 4, 1956; Chicago, Illinois, US
- Died: January 29, 2022 (aged 65–66); Scottsdale, Arizona, US
- Occupation(s): Sports anchor & commentator, radio host

Leslie Mark Shapiro (March 4, 1956 – January 29, 2022) was an American sports media figure, an anchor for CBS Sports, and a host of the ESPN radio talk program in Denver, Colorado. He was the play-by-play voice of the Bradley University athletic teams in Peoria, Illinois, before obtaining the post of sports anchor on the Denver CBS owned-and-operated station, KCNC-TV, and later the Fox affiliate KDVR, both of which featured him as the voice of the Denver Broncos. He was a frequent master of ceremonies for charitable events in the Denver area.

== Early life ==
Shapiro was born in 1956 in Chicago, Illinois, and was raised in Morton Grove, Illinois, Skokie, Illinois, and Wilmette, Illinois. He was graduated from Arizona State University with a degree in mass communication.

== Career ==
Shapiro started his career as a news writer and producer for KPNX in Phoenix, Arizona. He subsequently worked as a sports anchor for WEEK-TV in Peoria, Illinois, before moving to Denver in 1983. He was employed as a sports reporter and anchor by KCNC-TV for fifteen years from 1984 to 1999.

After his departure from KCNC-TV, Shapiro first worked for KDVR, before working at ESPN Radio and Mile High Sports radio. He covered the Broncos' Super Bowl victories in 1998 and 1999, the Avalanche’s first Stanley Cup championship, the inaugural season of the Colorado Rockies, and performed the play-by-play for the station’s coverage of the University of Colorado Boulder football. Shapiro was noted for mentoring other local reporters and broadcasters, such as Adam Schefter and Vic Lombardi. He also served as the master of ceremonies for many charitable functions around Denver, at which he would also display his considerable singing talent.

Shapiro left Mile High Sports in February 2020 after relocating to Arizona. Two months later, he partnered with Lombardi – a prostate cancer survivor – to create a podcast called We Are Unstoppable. It was intended to "shar[e] inspirational stories from great athletes, celebrities, and the most brilliant minds in medicine on how to beat adversity to win in life", and included guests such as Joe Theismann and Verne Lundquist. It was paused in the spring of 2021 when Shapiro's health deteriorated.

== Personal life ==
Shapiro was married to Paula for 38 years until his death. They met while in high school. Together, they had two children: Jessie and Cary. In February 2020, he and his wife moved to Scottsdale, Arizona, where he died on the afternoon of January 29, 2022, having suffered from lung cancer for five years, although he had never been a smoker.
