= KKMG =

Radio station in Pueblo, Colorado

Coordinates: 38.745°N 104.862°W

- Pueblo, Colorado; United States
- Broadcast area: Colorado Springs-Pueblo-Denver
- Frequency: 98.9 MHz (HD Radio)
- Branding: 98.9 Magic FM

Programming
- Format: Contemporary hit radio
- Affiliations: Westwood One

Ownership
- Owner: Cumulus Media; (Radio License Holding CBC, LLC)
- Sister stations: KATC, KCSF, KKFM, KKPK, KVOR

History
- First air date: January 1, 1967
- Former call signs: KVMN (1967–1978); KPLV (1978–1981); KRQY (1981–1983)
- Call sign meaning: Colorado (K) Magic

Technical information
- Licensing authority: FCC
- Facility ID: 11229
- Class: C
- ERP: 57,000 watts
- HAAT: 695 meters

Links
- Public license information: Public file; LMS
- Webcast: Listen Live
- Website: 989magicfm.com

KKMG (98.9 FM, 98.9 Magic FM), is a heritage top 40 (CHR) radio station located in the Colorado Springs-Pueblo-Denver radio market. The Cumulus Media outlet is licensed to Pueblo.

Magic FM is one of the most popular and recognized radio stations in Southern Colorado.

== History ==
98.9 signed on as KVMN on January 1, 1967. It was owned by the Pueblo Stereo Broadcasting Company. Recreation Broadcasting of Pueblo bought KVMN in 1974. As KVMN, the station broadcast a Beautiful Music/Easy Listening format. Horwin Broadcasting acquired it in 1978 and relaunched the station as KPLV Love 99 broadcasting an AC/AOR hybrid format; and KPLV became KRQY in 1981 switching to an AC/Classic Hits format.

In 1983, KRQY became Top 40/CHR KKMG "Magic 99", although it was on 98.9 and KVUU was on the 99.9 frequency.

In 1987, KKMG changed its moniker to "The All New Magic FM", ending confusion between them and KVUU. In fall 1988, KKMG moved its office and studios into the Colorado Springs area. Earlier in the spring of the same, direct competitor KATM first made the move into Colorado Springs to compete with the CHR leader at the time KIKX. To coincide with the move to Colorado Springs, KKMG switched to a Churban format (CHR-Urban).

The new Churban format was an instant success, and KKMG eventually forced KIKX and KATM out of the CHR format. KKMG moved back to a CHR-pop lean in 1994. Despite its good ratings, KKMG lost money, and entered a Lease marketing agreement with classic rocker KKFM in 1991. KKFM's parent company Citadel Broadcasting then purchased KKMG a few years later. Citadel merged with Cumulus Media on September 16, 2011.

KKMG dominated the radio ratings in Colorado Springs until 2004 when KIBT signed on with a Rhythmic Top 40 format.

In 2006, the Colorado Springs Gazette voted Magic FM as the "Best Radio Station In Colorado Springs."

On July 15, 2023, KKMG temporarily rebranded as “Taylor FM” playing only Taylor Swift songs during her tour stop in the nearby Denver area.
