= Kasisi Agricultural Training Centre =

Coordinates: 15°16′11.13″S 28°28′19.93″E

- Abbreviation: KATC
- Established: 1974; 52 years ago
- Region served: 10 km NE of Lusaka airport
- Director: Paul Desmarais
- Parent organization: Zambia-Malawi Jesuit Province
- Affiliations: Jesuit, Catholic
- Staff: 25 professionals 50 support staff
- Website: KATC

Kasisi Agricultural Training Centre (KATC) was founded by the Jesuits of the Zambia-Malawi Province in 1974 near Lusaka, Zambia. Since 1990 it has trained farmers in sustainable organic agriculture while carrying on research, extension, and lobbying efforts. It has its own farm to defray expenses.

== See also ==
- List of Jesuit sites
