= KRDO-TV =

Television station in Colorado Springs, Colorado

- Colorado Springs–Pueblo, Colorado; United States
- City: Colorado Springs, Colorado
- Channels: Digital: 24 (UHF); Virtual: 13
- Branding: KRDO 13

Programming
- Affiliations: 13.1: ABC; for others, see § Subchannels

Ownership
- Owner: News-Press & Gazette Company; (Pikes Peak Television, Inc.)
- Sister stations: KTLO-LD

History
- First air date: September 21, 1953
- Former channel number: Analog: 13 (VHF, 1953–2009)
- Former affiliations: NBC (1953–1960)
- Call sign meaning: Compressed approximation of Colorado

Technical information
- Licensing authority: FCC
- Facility ID: 52579
- ERP: 200 kW
- HAAT: 675 m (2,215 ft)
- Transmitter coordinates: 38°44′45.1″N 104°51′39.1″W
- Translator(s): see § Translators

Links
- Public license information: Public file; LMS
- Website: www.krdo.com

KRDO-TV (channel 13) is a television station in Colorado Springs, Colorado, United States, affiliated with ABC. It is owned by the News-Press & Gazette Company (NPG) alongside low-power Telemundo affiliate KTLO-LD (channel 46) and radio stations KRDO (1240 AM) and KRDO-FM 105.5. The four stations share studios on South 8th Street in Colorado Springs; KRDO-TV's transmitter is located on Cheyenne Mountain.

== History ==
KRDO-TV first went on the air on September 21, 1953, as an NBC affiliate. At that time, KKTV (channel 11) was a primary CBS affiliate with a secondary affiliation with ABC, and KCSJ-TV (channel 5, now KOAA-TV) was the NBC affiliate for nearby Pueblo. As such, during much of the 1950s, Southern Colorado was served by two full-time NBC affiliates and a CBS affiliate that also carried ABC programming.

By 1960, the formerly separate Colorado Springs and Pueblo TV markets melded into one single market serving the Pikes Peak region and surrounding areas. At that point, each of the three commercial TV stations became "exclusive" network affiliates with KKTV retaining CBS, KCSJ-TV continuing with NBC and KRDO-TV becoming a full-time ABC affiliate. KRDO was one of the few ABC affiliates that did not clear The Dick Cavett Show during the late 1960s and early 1970s.

KRDO-TV had been locally owned by Pikes Peak Broadcasting Company since the station signed on. In April 2006, the company announced that it was selling KRDO-TV (along with KRDO radio and KJCT in Grand Junction) to the News-Press & Gazette Company. News-Press & Gazette officially took over operations of KRDO-TV on June 26, 2006; in honor of Pikes Peak Broadcasting, it changed the name of its Colorado broadcast group to Pikes Peak Television (NPG would divest KJCT in November 2013).

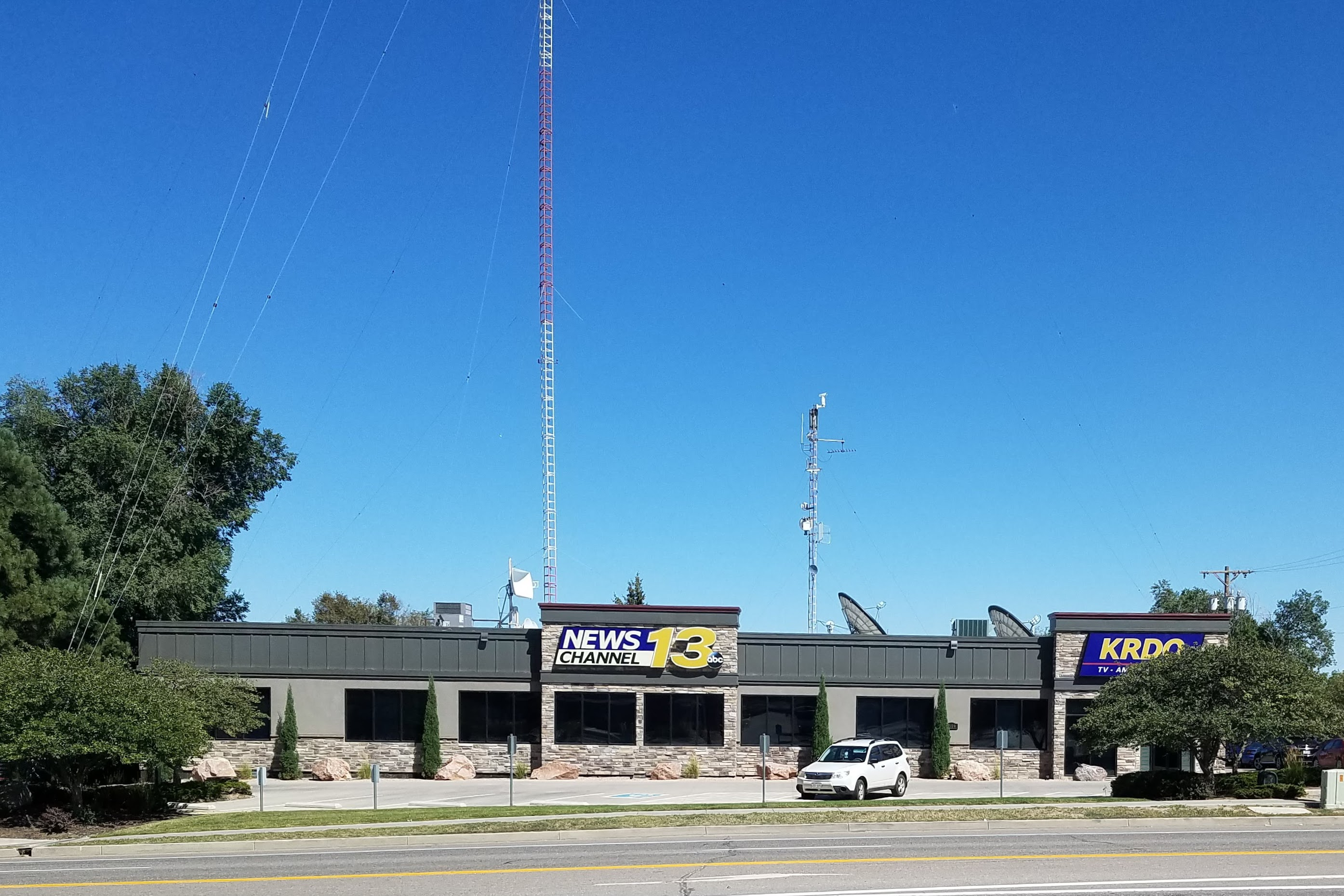
Colorado Springs studio

== News operation ==
KRDO-TV currently broadcasts 36 hours of local news each week (with six hours each weekday and three hours each on Saturdays and Sundays). It was the first station in the Colorado Springs–Pueblo market to start up local newscasts in the morning, starting with weekdays in early 1983 (originally running 15 minutes in length and extending the length of the morning newscast over time) and adding weekend morning newscasts about 24 years later.

KRDO-TV's news operation was rebranded from News 13 to NewsChannel 13 on the same day that NPG took over the station's operations. Under NPG, KRDO expanded its newscasts starting with 5 p.m. and 6 p.m. newscasts replacing the single early evening 5:30 p.m. newscasts. It added weekend morning newscasts (currently airing from 6 to 7 a.m. and 8 to 9 a.m. both on Saturdays and Sundays) that started in the final week of December 2006. In June 2007 it started a midday newscast that airs from noon to 1 p.m. Both were first anchored by former KKTV anchor Eric Singer who would anchor KRDO's 5 p.m. and 6 p.m. newscasts. Singer later worked at the Gazette as a reporter and anchor on the newspaper's new media platforms. As of 2018, Singer no longer works in media and/or any journalism field.

On July 23, 2008, KRDO-TV began broadcasting Southern Colorado's first local newscasts in high definition (HD), beginning with NewsChannel 13 at Noon.

On October 10, 2011, KRDO-TV added an early evening newscast at 4:30 p.m. The early evening newscast was moved up and extended to 4 p.m. during September 2012.

=== Former on-air staff ===
- David Brody – news director
- Giselle Fernández – began her broadcasting career as the Pueblo reporter for KRDO-TV in 1983
- John Gurtler – sports anchor

== Technical information ==
=== Subchannels ===
The station's signal is multiplexed:

Subchannels of KRDO-TV
Subchannel	Res.	Short name	Programming
13.1	720p	KRDO-HD	ABC
13.2	720p	KTLO	Telemundo (KTLO-LD)
13.3	480i	QRDO	Newscast replays
13.4	480i	DRDO	Dabl
13.5	480i	VRDO	QVC
13.6	480i	HRDO	HSN
13.7	480i	IRDO	Heroes & Icons

Simulcast of subchannels of another station

=== Analog-to-digital conversion ===
KRDO-TV shut down its analog signal, over VHF channel 13, on June 12, 2009, the official date on which full-power television stations in the United States transitioned from analog to digital broadcasts under federal mandate. The station's digital signal remained on its pre-transition UHF channel 24, using virtual channel 13.

=== Translators ===
- WQLQ837 Badger Mountain
- K28KC-D Cañon City
- K38MK-D Cheyenne Wells
- K36JB-D Cripple Creek
- K18LL-D Eads, etc.
- K17IG-D Hoehne
- K19MN-D Lake George
- K34NM-D Lamar
- K27KX-D Las Animas
- K20JG-D Salida, etc.
- K09DY-D Westcliffe
