= KKCO =

Television station in Grand Junction, Colorado

- Grand Junction, Colorado; United States
- Channels: Digital: 12 (VHF); Virtual: 11
- Branding: KKCO 11 News; Telemundo Grand Junction–Montrose (11.2)

Programming
- Affiliations: 11.1: NBC; 11.3: Telemundo; for others, see § Subchannels

Ownership
- Owner: E. W. Scripps Company; (ION Television License, LLC)
- Sister stations: KJCT-CD

History
- Founded: December 16, 1994
- First air date: July 29, 1996
- Former channel numbers: Analog: 11 (VHF, 1996–2009)
- Former affiliations: The CW (11.2, 2006−2008)
- Call sign meaning: Colorado

Technical information
- Licensing authority: FCC
- Facility ID: 24766
- ERP: 5.3 kW
- HAAT: 452 m (1,483 ft)
- Transmitter coordinates: 39°3′59.9″N 108°44′47.4″W
- Translator(s): 9 (VHF) Paonia; for others, see § Translators

Links
- Public license information: Public file; LMS
- Website: www.kkco11news.com

KKCO (channel 11) is a television station in Grand Junction, Colorado, United States, affiliated with NBC and Telemundo. It is owned by the E. W. Scripps Company alongside low-power, Class A station KJCT-CD (channel 8), an affiliate of ABC. The two stations share studios on Blichmann Avenue in Grand Junction; KKCO's transmitter is located at the Black Ridge Electronics Site at the Colorado National Monument west of the city.

The station signed on for the first time on July 29, 1996, providing Grand Junction its first in-market NBC affiliate. Its local newscasts rose to number one in the market shortly after debuting. Originally owned by Eagle III Broadcasting, it was purchased by Gray Media in 2005 and traded to Scripps in 2026.

== History ==
In 1994, multiple groups applied for a construction permit to build channel 11 in Grand Junction. However, the process of awarding such permits through the comparative hearing process long used by the Federal Communications Commission (FCC) had been forcibly derogated by a court ruling finding its criteria "arbitrary and capricious". In 1995, the commission opened a 90-day settlement window to encourage settlements or mergers among applicants for channels with multiple applicants. Among the settlements received was a merger of Uhlmann/Latshaw Broadcasting LLC and Grand Junction Television Partners. The lead partner in the merged corporation, Bill Varecha, had previously run a radio station in Vail, where he noticed the lack of a local NBC affiliate; he had previously built and sold WCEE-TV in Mount Vernon, Illinois, in the 1980s, as well as WAYK in Melbourne, Florida.

KKCO began broadcasting on July 29, 1996; in addition to broadcasting NBC, the station also served as a secondary affiliate of UPN. Its launch had the effect of removing Denver NBC affiliate KUSA from TCI Cable's systems on the Western Slope. This led to letters to the editor in publications including The Denver Post and Broadcasting & Cable from viewers who were upset at the loss of the Denver station's newscasts and Denver Broncos preseason games. At the crux of the station's inability to air the Broncos was the team's unwillingness to share preseason television revenue with the National Football League, which stipulated that any sale to a station outside a 75-mile (121 km) radius from the main city was shared revenue. TCI was able to broadcast the Broncos preseason games beginning in 1998 by arrangement with KUSA, and KKCO itself gained the rights in 2003.

The station initially simulcast some of KUSA's newscasts while it developed its own news department. The station began producing its own newscasts later in 1996; within 18 months, KKCO had risen to number one in the market in ratings and revenue.

In 2004, Gray Television bought the station and its translator in Montrose from Eagle III Broadcasting LLC for $13.5 million. Gray closed on the purchase in February 2005. At the time of the purchase, Varecha was working for Gray as its general manager in Charlottesville, Virginia, where it was starting up WCAV and WVAW-LP.

On July 7, 2025, it was announced that, in an exchange of several stations between Gray Media and the E. W. Scripps Company, KKCO and KJCT-LP would be traded to Scripps. The FCC approved the multi-market exchange on April 28, 2026.

=== Attack of Ja'Ronn Alex ===
On December 18, 2024, KKCO reporter Ja'Ronn Alex was allegedly followed by 39-year-old Patrick Thomas Egan, a taxi cab driver, for about 40 miles (64 km) from the Delta area to the KKCO studios in Grand Junction. Alex, who was out reporting and driving a news vehicle, was allegedly followed by Egan in his company taxi. Upon reaching Grand Junction, Egan pulled up beside Alex at a stoplight, questioned Alex's citizenship, said that it was "Trump's America now", and added that he was a Marine and had taken "an oath to protect this country from people like [Alex]". Alex then returned to the news station, where he was chased by Egan, who demanded for Alex's identification before tackling him and putting him into a headlock. Coworkers ran out to protect Alex and said that Alex was apparently struggling to breathe. Part of the attack was captured on surveillance video. Egan was arrested on suspicion of bias-motivated crimes, second-degree assault by strangulation, and harassment by following and ethnic intimidation; and his bail was set at $20,000. Alex told Grand Junction police that he believed he had been attacked because he was Pacific Islander. Egan's public defender said that he intended to plead not guilty during the trial, which was scheduled to begin January 12, 2026.

== Technical information ==
=== Subchannels ===
The station's signal is multiplexed:

Subchannels of KKCO
Subchannel	Res.	Short name	Programming
11.1	1080i	KKCO-DT	NBC
11.2	480i	MeTV	MeTV
11.3	1080i	TELE-HD	Telemundo
11.4	480i	KKCOOUT	Outlaw
11.5	480i	MeToons	Ion Mystery

=== Translators ===
- K08HN-D Aspen (in Denver market)
- K17JA-D Basalt (in Denver market)
- K13RD-D Collbran
- K16MR-D Gateway
- K25FZ-D Grand Junction
- K09ZS-D Mesa
- K36NQ-D Mesa
- K23NW-D Montrose
- KKCO (DRT) 9 Paonia (in Denver market)
- K26IT-D Redstone, etc. (in Denver market)
- K36LV-D Snowmass Village (in Denver market)
- K11LM-D Thomasville (in Denver market)
