= Michelle Tuzee =

American television news anchor

- Education: University of Southern California
- Occupation: Television journalist
- Employer(s): KJCT; WBAY-TV; WFTX-TV; WSVN-TV; KABC-TV (1997 – 2020)
- Children: 3

Michelle Tuzee is a former television news anchor. Tuzee is best known for her 23 years as a lead anchor at KABC-TV Los Angeles. Tuzee co-anchored KABC's Eyewitness News at 5 p.m. and 11 p.m. with Marc Brown.

== Biography ==
Tuzee graduated with a Bachelor of Arts degree from the University of Southern California where she majored in journalism. Tuzee's first job in television news was at KJCT in Grand Junction, Colorado. She was a general assignment reporter and later a producer and anchor. Other stints included reporting and anchoring at WBAY-TV, Green Bay, Wisconsin, lead co-anchor at WFTX-TV in Fort Myers, Florida, and co-anchor of the top-rated Today in Florida and 7 News at Noon at WSVN in Miami.

In 1997, Tuzee joined KABC as anchor. She received an Emmy award as part of a team win for Best Newscast, an Associated Press award for excellence in reporting, and a Telly Award for her work with Children's Hospital Los Angeles..

On December 18, 2020, Tuzee stepped back from her duties as news anchor due to health concerns.
