= KATC-FM =

Radio station in Colorado Springs, Colorado

- Colorado Springs, Colorado; United States
- Broadcast area: Colorado Springs-Pueblo-Denver
- Frequency: 95.1 MHz
- Branding: Cat Country 95.1

Programming
- Format: Country
- Affiliations: Westwood One

Ownership
- Owner: Cumulus Media; (Radio License Holding CBC, LLC)
- Sister stations: KCSF; KKFM; KKMG; KKPK; KVOR

History
- First air date: October 1, 1969 (as KRDO-FM)
- Former call signs: KRDO-FM (1969–2006)
- Call sign meaning: "Cat Country"

Technical information
- Licensing authority: FCC
- Facility ID: 66249
- Class: C
- ERP: 72,000 watts
- HAAT: 695 meters (2,280 ft)
- Transmitter coordinates: 38°44′43″N 104°51′40.9″W
- Translator: 104.9 K285EE (Canon City)

Links
- Public license information: Public file; LMS
- Webcast: Listen live
- Website: www.catcountry951.com

KATC-FM (95.1 MHz) is a commercial radio station in Colorado Springs, Colorado. The station has been broadcasting a country music format since 2006 and its on-air moniker is "Cat Country 95.1". The station is owned and operated by Cumulus Media, with its studios and offices on Commerce Drive. Its transmitter is located near Cheyenne Mountain State Park. Programming is also heard on 30-watt translator station K285EE at 104.9 MHz in Canon City, Colorado.

== History ==
On October 1, 1969, the station first signed on. It was locally owned by Harry Hoth's Pikes Peak Broadcasting Company under the call sign KRDO-FM. It was the sister station to KRDO, which Hoth had first put on the air in 1947, Colorado Springs' second radio station. KRDO-FM broadcast a beautiful music format of instrumental songs, and would later shift to easy listening.

As the easy listening format began to decline due to older demographics, KRDO-FM flipped to a soft adult contemporary format and adopted the moniker "Peak 95.1" in 1994. In 1998, KRDO-FM evolved into hot AC.

After being purchased by Citadel Broadcasting, the station prepared for a major format switch. "Cat Country 95.1" began broadcasting on July 1, 2006, stunting by repeatedly playing Brooks & Dunn's "Play Something Country". After several days of stunting, the station began its regular mainstream country programming, featuring a complete air staff. As part of the flip, the longtime KRDO-FM call letters would be changed to KATC-FM. Citadel would revive the "Peak" moniker and AC format in late 2006 on sister station 92.9 FM, under new call letters KKPK; the KRDO-FM call sign would also return later that year on 105.5 FM, a simulcast of KRDO AM.

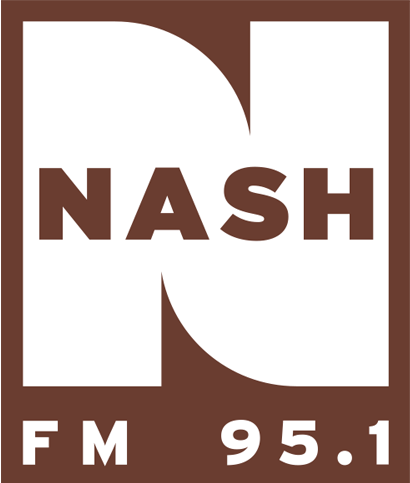
Logo as "Nash FM 95.1"

Citadel merged with Cumulus Media on September 16, 2011. On October 31, 2014, KATC rebranded as "Nash FM 95.1". The Nash FM moniker was used on numerous Cumulus country stations around the U.S. KATC returned to the "Cat Country" moniker on April 8, 2020.

== Translator ==
Call sign	Frequency	City of license	FID	ERP (W)	HAAT	Class	Transmitter coordinates	FCC info
K285EE	104.9 FM	Canon City, Colorado	52583	30	−93 m (−305 ft)	D	38°25′19.9″N 105°9′6.9″W	LMS
