= KVOR =

Coordinates: 39°05′02″N 104°42′42.9″W

- Colorado Springs, Colorado; United States
- Broadcast area: Colorado Springs-Pueblo Metropolitan Area
- Frequency: 740 kHz
- Branding: Colorado's 740 KVOR

Programming
- Format: News/talk
- Network: ABC News Radio
- Affiliations: Premiere Networks; Westwood One; Red Apple Media; Air Force Falcons

Ownership
- Owner: Cumulus Media; (Radio License Holding CBC, LLC)
- Sister stations: KATC, KCSF, KKFM, KKMG, KKPK

History
- First air date: March 29, 1955; 71 years ago
- Former call signs: KWBY (1955–1959); KSSS (1959–1993); KTWK (1993–2000)
- Call sign meaning: "Voice of the Rockies"

Technical information
- Licensing authority: FCC
- Facility ID: 35869
- Class: B
- Power: 3,300 watts day 1,500 watts night

Links
- Public license information: Public file; LMS
- Webcast: Listen Live
- Website: kvor.com

KVOR (740 AM, "AM 740 KVOR") is a commercial radio station in Colorado Springs, Colorado, serving Colorado Springs and Pueblo. It is owned by Cumulus Media and airs a news/talk radio format.

KVOR is powered at 3,300 watts by day. But because AM 740 is a clear-channel frequency reserved for Class A CFZM Toronto, KVOR must reduce power at night to 1,500 watts to avoid interference. It uses a directional antenna at all times, with a north-south pattern that covers Pueblo, even though the station's transmitter is located north of downtown Colorado Springs, near Thompson Road. Studios and offices are located on Corporate Drive in Colorado Springs.

The KVOR weekday schedule begins with Colorado Springs' Morning News followed by a local late morning talk show hosted by Richard Randall. The rest of the weekday line up is made up of nationally syndicated talk shows: The Vince Show with Vince Coglianese, The Will Cain Show, The Mark Levin Show, Ground Zero with Clyde Lewis, The Chris Plante Show, Red Eye Radio and America in the Morning. Weekends feature shows on money, food, computers, law and religion including Bill Handel on the Law, The Larry Kudlow Show, Focus on the Family and The Jesus Christ Show with Neil Saavedra. KVOR partners with local TV station KOAA (an NBC TV Network affiliate) for news and weather coverage. Most hours begin with world and national news from ABC News Radio.

KVOR broadcasts the Air Force Falcons football and basketball games.

== History ==
In order to provide extended coverage to the growing Colorado Springs and Pueblo media markets, in 2000 KVOR switched frequencies with sister station 740 KTWK. KVOR continued its news-talk format on AM 740, while AM 1300 became adult standards outlet KTWK, carrying the Music of Your Life radio network. (Today it is CBS Sports Radio station KCSF.) With the switch, AM 740 inherited the legacy of Colorado Springs' oldest radio station; it signed on as KFUM in 1922 before becoming KVOR in 1931. The 740 frequency came on the air on March 29, 1955.

KVOR's transmitter was temporarily offline during the 2013 Black Forest Fire. The station was known previously as "News/Talk 740," "Newsradio 740," and most recently "Colorado Springs' Talk Station."
