= KRDO (AM) =

Radio station in Colorado Springs, Colorado

- Colorado Springs, Colorado; United States
- Broadcast area: Colorado Springs metropolitan area
- Frequency: 1240 kHz
- Branding: KRDO NewsRadio 105.5FM & 1240AM

Programming
- Format: News/talk
- Affiliations: Premiere Networks; Westwood One; ABC News Radio

Ownership
- Owner: News-Press & Gazette Company; (Pikes Peak Radio, LLC)
- Sister stations: KRDO-FM; KRDO-TV

History
- First air date: March 1947
- Call sign meaning: "Colorado"

Technical information
- Licensing authority: FCC
- Facility ID: 66250
- Class: C
- Power: 1,000 watts
- Transmitter coordinates: 38°49′43″N 104°50′20″W
- Translator: 92.5 K223CU (Colorado Springs)

Links
- Public license information: Public file; LMS
- Webcast: Listen live
- Website: www.krdo.com/radio

KRDO (1240 AM) is a commercial radio station in Colorado Springs, Colorado. The station is owned and operated by the News-Press & Gazette Company of St. Joseph, Missouri and it airs a news/talk radio format, simulcast with KRDO-FM 105.5. Both stations are aided by the news department of co-owned KRDO-TV, with some TV newscasts also heard on the radio stations.

Studios, offices and the AM transmitter are on South 8th Street in Colorado Springs. Weekdays, after a morning news block, KRDO-AM-FM carry nationally syndicated programs, three of which are about family finances: Dave Ramsey, Clark Howard and Denver-based Tom Martino. Also heard weekdays are Sean Hannity, Clyde Lewis and Coast to Coast AM with George Noory. Weekends feature shows on money, health, home repair, guns, computers and travel. Syndicated weekend hosts include Kim Komando and Rudy Maxa. Some weekend hours are paid brokered programming. Most hours begin with world and national news from ABC News Radio.

== History ==
In March 1947, KRDO first signed on. It was owned by the Pikes Peak Broadcasting Company and was Colorado Springs' second radio station (after KVOR). The call sign has always been KRDO, referring to Colorado, with a "K" substituting for the "C". The station originally transmitted with a power of 250 watts.

In 1953, KRDO put a TV station on the air, KRDO-TV (channel 13), as Colorado Springs' NBC television affiliate. (The TV station today is an ABC affiliate.) By the late 1960s, KRDO got a daytime power boost to 1,000 watts, though the station still had to reduce power at night to 250 watts. In 1969, an FM station was put on the air: KRDO-FM 95.1, a music outlet.

In 1975, KRDO joined NBC Radio's News and Information Service to become an all-news radio station. When that service was discontinued in 1977, KRDO switched to a middle of the road format of popular music and news, as an affiliate of the Mutual Broadcasting System. and later the RKO Radio Network. By the mid-1980s, the older songs were dropped and the station moved to a full service adult contemporary music format while returning to Mutual Broadcasting and clearing Larry King's evening talk program. In 1985, the FCC allowed KRDO to remain powered at 1,000 watts, both day and night. In late 1987, KRDO switched to an oldies format utilizing the Pure Gold (now Classic Hits) services from Satellite Music Network (SMN), whose interests are now owned by Westwood One which in turn is currently owned by Cumulus Media. In 1991, the station flipped to a country music format. By the mid-1990s, the station was broadcasting an all sports format. During most of its run as a sports station, KRDO carried One on One Sports.

In June 2006, KRDO-AM-TV were sold to the News-Press & Gazette Company, while KRDO-FM went to Citadel Broadcasting, switching call letters to KATC-FM as a country music outlet. The Hoth family, as Pikes Peak Broadcasting, had owned KRDO from its founding in 1947 until 2006, nearly six decades. The new owners coupled KRDO with FM 105.5, changing the FM call sign to KRDO-FM and having both radio stations simulcast a news-talk format, while drawing on the news department resources of KRDO-TV.

KRDO (AM) is rebroadcast on translator K223CU in Colorado Springs at 92.5 FM.
