= Tom Martino =

American radio host (born 1953)

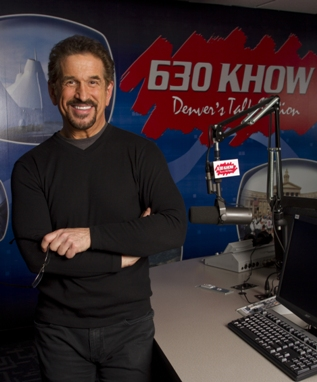
- Martino in Studio
- Born: 1953 (age 72–73)
- Occupation: Broadcast Artist "The Troubleshooter Show"
- Years active: 1974–present
- Spouse: N/A
- Website: Referrallist.com

Thomas Gerard Martino (born 1953) is a consumer advocate and American talk radio host. He is also known as "The Troubleshooter". His nationally syndicated show "The Troubleshooter Show" airs from KHOW, based in Denver, Colorado. His show format focuses on callers who give him specific complaints about businesses; ask general consumer oriented questions; or have various problems they need help solving. He also provides business and consumer advice to listeners. Martino investigates the complaints by contacting the other party in disputes when possible; he then gives advice and solicits comments from callers. The show began more than 38 years ago and was syndicated nationally around 2001. Martino says that over the years, he has recovered hundreds of millions of dollars in cash, merchandise, and services for consumers who contact him.

== Radio career ==
Martino's career began at the Catskill Daily Mail, a newspaper in his native New York, where he wrote a consumer-oriented column. In 1976, he began working in radio and television. He continued to write columns for the Rocky Mountain News, but now writes columns only for his own website.

Martino brought his consumer advocacy to television, first at several stations in the Eastern United States. In Denver, he spent 18 years at CBS station KCNC-TV. His most recent television position was with Fox Broadcasting Company affiliate KDVR in Denver, which dropped his show from the schedule in 2011.

Martino is known for his bold style. If he believes a businessperson is acting unethically, he does not hesitate to call that person a liar or a cheat on air. If he believes a business is failing to respond to his investigation, he sometimes broadcasts the business's phone number and encourages listeners to contact the business.

He is also known for letting consumers know when they are in the wrong and aids them in rectifying the situation and avoiding it in the future.

On April 24, 2009, the U.S. Court of Appeals for the Ninth Circuit issued an opinion affirming the dismissal of a libel suit brought against Martino by an Oregon watercraft dealer. A customer of the dealer had called Martino's show to describe the problems she had with a personal watercraft that she bought from the dealer, and in the course of the on-the-air conversation, Martino said "they're just lying to you." The dealer sued Martino for libel and interference with business relations. The federal district court in Portland granted Martino's anti-SLAPP motion, dismissed the dealer's case, and awarded attorney fees to Martino against the dealer. The Court of Appeals affirmed the trial court, saying that Martino's statement was a statement of opinion protected by the First Amendment. Gardner v. Martino, Ninth Circuit No. 06-35437 (April 24, 2009).

== Businessman & Legal Troubles ==
Martino operates the "Troubleshooter Referral List," a list of businesses endorsed by him. In order to be a member of the Referral List, a business must agree to a code of ethics, including an agreement to abide by Martino's decision in the case of a dispute with a consumer. A business can pay to have Martino personally endorse their product or service on air, though critics say that Tom Martino's status as a consumer advocate is compromised by the money he receives for his endorsements. Martino's website has a lengthy disclaimer stating that he is not liable for the quality of service received from the companies he endorses. However, it is the only form of advertising that offers recourse to consumers through, arbitration, public testimonials, media exposure and public censure and suspension of members who do not measure up.

On his website, Martino states: "Although the Referral List is paid advertising, no members can "buy" their way onto the list nor can they remain members unless they adhere to our strict code of ethics." The Referral List website also addresses the member fee structure, stating, "Members of the Referral List are charged fees commensurate with the feedback and complaints generated in their fields of endeavor. Since we handle any and all complaints about members, it stands to reason that those categories that generate the most work for us will be charged more than those that hardly ever generate feedback... Current members pay anywhere from $1,200 annually for a tiny business in a single category all the way up to $16,000 annually for a large businesses covering many categories with several locations."

Martino also began Liberty Bell Telecom, a telecommunications company, and sold it to Dish Network in 2010.

He was also a real estate developer and a private helicopter and airplane pilot.

On September 2, 2011, Tom Martino filed for Chapter 7 bankruptcy. He had borrowed heavily to invest in real estate, and became insolvent when real estate prices dropped. Martino said that he owed about $36 million, although his creditors put the figure at $78 million. The filing was contested when some creditors accused Martino of improperly transferring property into his wife's name, which he denied. After a thorough investigation, the U.S. Bankruptcy Court dismissed the lawsuit tied to Martino's personal bankruptcy and lawyers from First Citizens Bank & Trust acknowledged, "no fraud or false pretenses" on Martino's behalf. After a series of court proceedings, the bankruptcy was settled in March 2013. The only debt included in Martino's bankruptcy filing were real estate business loans. All personal debt was paid before or shortly after his bankruptcy.

On December 21, 2013, Martino was arrested by the Denver police for investigation of disturbing the peace and domestic violence. The assault charge was dropped due to a lack of evidence. He did not contest the charge of disturbing the peace and accepted that conviction. All arrest records, charges, and convictions have been expunged from his record.
