= KLML =

Television station in Grand Junction, Colorado

- Grand Junction, Colorado; United States
- Channels: Digital: 7 (VHF); Virtual: 20

Programming
- Affiliations: 20.1: Court TV; for others, see § Subchannels

Ownership
- Owner: Ventura Broadcasting; (Ventura Media Communications GJ LLC)

History
- First air date: October 22, 1979
- Former call signs: KJCT (1979–October 2014, November–December 2014); KGBY (October–November 2014, December 2014–2020)
- Former channel numbers: Analog: 8 (VHF, 1979–2009); Virtual: 8 (2005–2014)
- Former affiliations: ABC (1979–2014); Cozi TV (2014–2020)

Technical information
- Licensing authority: FCC
- Facility ID: 52593
- ERP: 9.7 kW
- HAAT: 892 m (2,927 ft)
- Transmitter coordinates: 39°2′54.9″N 108°15′8.2″W
- Translator(s): see § Translator

Links
- Public license information: Public file; LMS

KLML (channel 20) is a television station in Grand Junction, Colorado, United States, serving Colorado's Western Slope region as an affiliate of Court TV. The station is owned by Fresno, California–based Ventura Broadcasting. KLML's transmitter is located at the Mesa Point Electronics Site on the Grand Mesa (southeast of I-70).

== History ==
KLML signed on the air on October 22, 1979, as KJCT, the first television station in Western Colorado since KREX-TV in 1954. It was owned by the Pikes Peak Broadcasting Company as a semi-satellite of fellow ABC affiliate KRDO-TV in Colorado Springs. Before channel 8's sign-on, all three major networks had been shoehorned onto KREX-TV. However, cable viewers could watch the full ABC schedule via Denver's KBTV (channel 9, now KUSA).

The station had full production facilities in Grand Junction; however, much of the programming was fed via hundreds of miles of microwave links from KRDO. In the late 1990s, KJCT chief engineer Roger Hightower modernized KJCT into one of the first true digital facilities in Colorado, and severed the electronic umbilical cord with KRDO.

KJCT was the first Western Colorado television station with modern electronic news gathering technology. "8 Live," the stations' first live microwave newsvan, came into service in 1984.

In 2006, News-Press & Gazette Company announced the purchase of KJCT along with KRDO-TV and KRDO radio from Pikes Peak Broadcasting.

As of January 2007, KJCT added a new second subchannel carrying Telemundo programming. In late 2008, KJCT's third digital subcarrier became western Colorado's affiliate for The CW. However, despite The CW being available locally, Denver's KWGN-TV, which has been on cable for decades in Grand Junction, is still available through two low-powered repeaters in the area.

On August 2, 2013, News Press & Gazette announced the sale of KJCT's license assets to Excalibur Broadcasting and its non-license assets to Gray Television; Excalibur is owned by former Gray executive, Don Ray. Gray planned to operate the station through joint sales and shared services agreements, making KJCT a sister station to KKCO. The sale was completed on October 31. This was NPG's first broadcast divestiture since the sale of its original group of five stations to New Vision Television in 1993.

In the wake of the FCC's increased scrutiny towards virtual duopolies, Gray announced that it would move KJCT's programming to a subchannel of KKCO, and sell KJCT to a minority owned broadcaster, which would operate the station autonomously from KJCT or any other broadcaster. On August 27, 2014, Gray announced that it would sell KJCT to Jeff Chang and Gabriela Gomez-Chang, owner of KQSL. On October 28, 2014, the call sign became KGBY; this change was temporary and was reverted to KJCT in November 19, 2014, with the permanent change to KGBY slated to occur upon the completion of the sale. A week earlier, on October 21, the FCC approved a swap of virtual channels between KJCT/KGBY and a co-owned low-power station in Grand Junction, KKHD-LP (channel 20), that Gray simultaneously acquired; as a result, KGBY uses PSIP to map to virtual channel 20, while KKHD inherited virtual channel 8, as well as KJCT's ABC programming. The swap was intended to reduce viewer confusion that would otherwise result from a move of ABC programming. The sale was completed on December 15, at which point the KGBY call sign returned. Gray subsequently changed KKHD's call letters to KJCT-LP.

On November 3, 2020, the station changed its callsign to KLML. Earlier that year, the station switched to Court TV, moving Cozi TV to the fourth subchannel. The KGBY-LD call sign was then placed by Chang on the construction permit formerly known as K10QV-D at Palm Springs, California, which he had purchased earlier in the year.

== News operation ==
On May 22, 2009, KJCT became the first station in Grand Junction to launch local news in high definition. The station debuted a new set in May 2011, to coincide with a new graphics package. In July 2011, KJCT overtook its competitors to become the top rated station in the coveted 25–54 demographic in all weekday newscasts. The news operation moved along with KJCT's other programming to KKHD-LP in late 2014; as of November 2020, KLML does not show news programming.

=== Notable former on-air staff ===
- John Gurtler – sports anchor
- Michelle Tuzee – anchor/reporter

== Technical information ==
=== Subchannels ===
The station's digital signal is multiplexed:

Subchannels of KLML
Subchannel	Res.	Short name	Programming
20.1	720p	Court TV	Court TV
20.2	480i	HNI	Heroes & Icons
20.3	480i	IONPlus	Ion Plus
20.4	480i	Cozi	Cozi TV
20.5	480i	GetTV	Great
20.6	480i	Start	Start TV
20.7	480i	MVSGLD	MovieSphere Gold
20.8	480i	Story	Story Television
20.19	480i	Newsmx2	Newsmax2
20.10	480i	Daystar	Daystar
20.11	480i	QVC	QVC
20.12	480i	Buzzr	Buzzr
20.13	480i	Antenna	Antenna TV (4:3)
20.14	480i	JTV	Jewelry Television

=== Translator ===
City of license	Callsign	Channel	ERP	HAAT	Facility ID	Transmitter coordinates	Owner
Grand Junction	K36QV-D	36	0.04 kW	−121 m (−397 ft)	130616	39°5′46.6″N 108°35′19.9″W	Ventura Media Communications GJ LLC
