= Badger Mountain (Colorado) =

Mountain in Colorado, United States

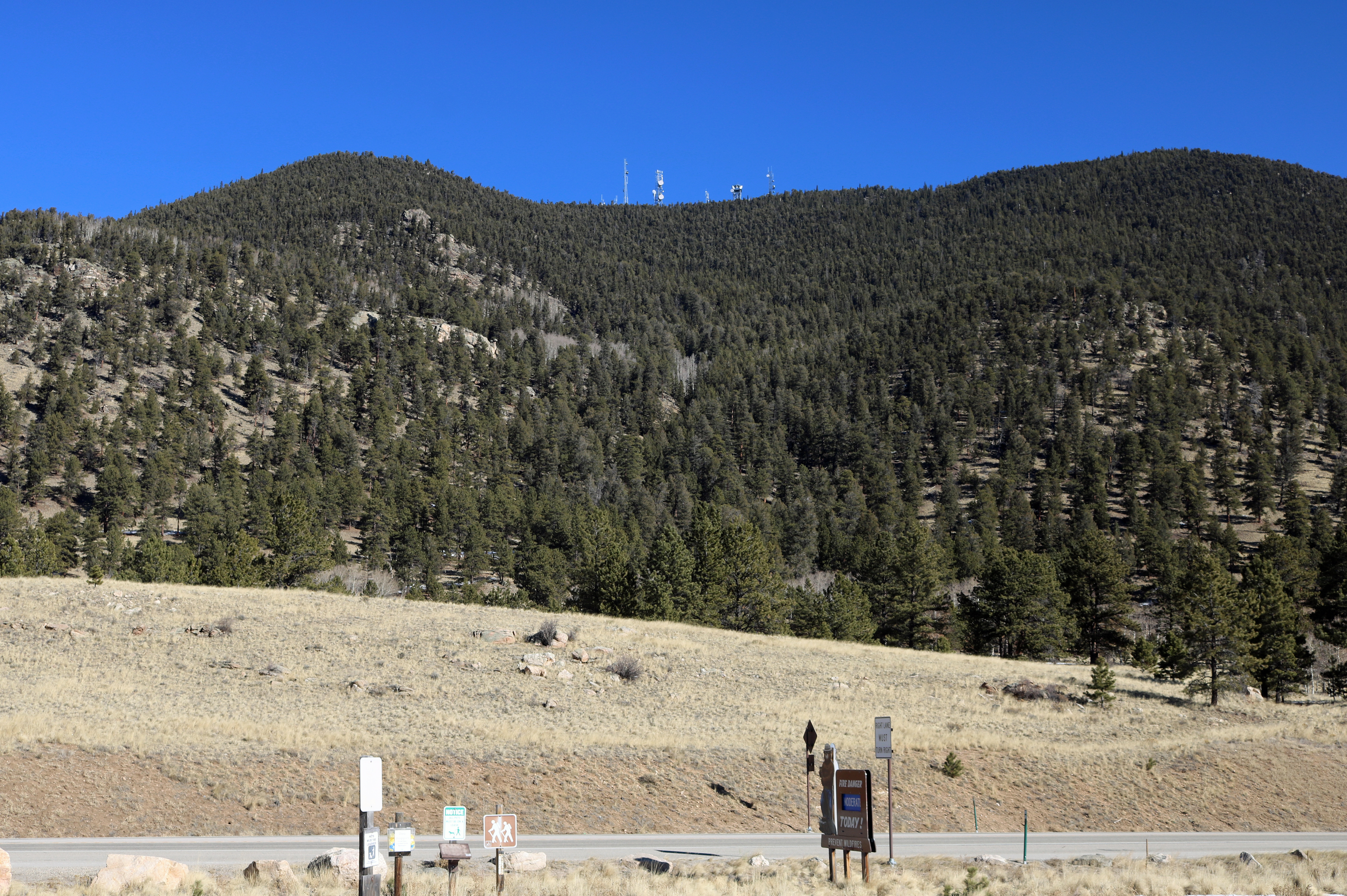
- The mountain viewed from the Wilkerson Pass visitor center

Highest point
- Elevation: 11,295 ft (3,443 m)
- Prominence: 1,561 ft (476 m)
- Isolation: 6.32 mi (10.17 km)
- Coordinates: 39°02′57″N 105°30′46″W

Geography
- Location within Colorado
- Location: Park County, Colorado, U.S.
- Parent range: Front Range, South Park Hills
- Topo map(s): USGS 7.5' topographic map Glentivar, Colorado

Badger Mountain is a mountain summit in the South Park Hills of the Rocky Mountains of North America. The 11,295-foot (3,443 m) peak is located in Pike National Forest, 9.6 miles (15.5 km) northwest by west (bearing 300°) of the community of Lake George in Park County, Colorado, United States.

Badger mountain is the most prominent mountain of the Puma Hills area, overlooking nearby Wilkerson Pass. It borders the edge of the Lost Creek Wilderness. Badger Mountain road allows motor vehicles access to the summit.

== See also ==
- List of Colorado mountain ranges
- List of Colorado mountain summits
  - List of Colorado fourteeners
  - List of Colorado 4000 meter prominent summits
  - List of the most prominent summits of Colorado
- List of Colorado county high points
