= KRDO-FM =

- Security, Colorado; United States
- Broadcast area: Colorado Springs-Pueblo, Colorado
- Frequency: 105.5 MHz
- Branding: KRDO NewsRadio FM 105.5 AM 1240

Programming
- Format: News/talk
- Affiliations: ABC News Radio; Compass Media Networks; Premiere Networks; Salem Radio Network

Ownership
- Owner: News-Press & Gazette Company; (Pikes Peak Television, Inc.)
- Sister stations: KRDO; KRDO-TV

History
- First air date: April 8, 1973 (as KWYD)
- Former call signs: KWYD (1973–1987); KWYD-FM (1987–1989); KBZE (1989–1991); KHII (1991–1996); KSKX (1996–2006)
- Call sign meaning: As in "Colorado"

Technical information
- Licensing authority: FCC
- Facility ID: 50402
- Class: C2
- ERP: 1,600 watts
- HAAT: 652 meters (2,139 ft)
- Transmitter coordinates: 38°44′40″N 104°51′41″W

Links
- Public license information: Public file; LMS
- Webcast: Listen live
- Website: www.krdo.com/radio

KRDO-FM (105.5 MHz) is a commercial radio station licensed to Security, Colorado and serving the Colorado Springs-Pueblo media market. It is owned and operated by the News-Press & Gazette Company of St. Joseph, Missouri, through its licensee Pikes Peak Television, Inc. KRDO-FM airs a news/talk radio format. All programming is simulcast on KRDO (1240 AM), and both radio stations share news resources with co-owned KRDO-TV.

Studios and offices are on South 8th Street in Colorado Springs. The transmitter is off Transmitter Lane, also in Colorado Springs, amid antennas for several area FM and TV stations.

Weekdays, after a morning news block, KRDO-AM-FM carries two talk shows, both of which are about family finances: Dave Ramsey, and Denver-based Tom Martino. KRDO-AM-FM also carries an hour of local news in the noon hour, along with an afternoon news block from 4 p.m. until 7 p.m. Also heard weekdays are Sean Hannity and Coast to Coast AM with George Noory. Weekends feature shows on money, health, home repair, guns, computers and travel. Syndicated weekend hosts include Kim Komando. Some weekend hours are paid brokered programming. Most hours begin with world and national news from ABC News Radio.

== 105.5 history ==
On April 8, 1973, the station signed on as KWYD under the ownership of Edward J. Patrick. For the first few years, KWYD broadcast a country music format before flipping to a Christian radio format in 1975, programming a combination of national and local brokered preaching and instructional shows, as well as inspirational music. In 1989, Patrick sold KWYD-FM to Optima Communications which flipped the station to a new-age music/smooth jazz format as KBZE, using the on-air moniker The Breeze.

Two years later, the call letters and format were changed again. The station became a country outlet with the call sign KHII, using the on-air handle "K-High". Optima Communications entered into a local marketing agreement (LMA) with Pikes Peak Broadcasting Company to operate the station in 1993. In the fall of 1996, Pikes Peak flipped the station back to a smooth jazz format. This time it was called Sax 105.5 and adopted the KSKX call letters. The station remained smooth jazz until News-Press & Gazette Company (NPG) took over the management of the station and flipped the station to a simulcast of KRDO's news/talk format as KRDO-FM in August 2006. In 2015, Optima Communications sold KRDO-FM to NPG.

== KRDO-FM call sign history ==
The KRDO-FM call letters had previously been used on 95.1 MHz in the Colorado Springs radio market, the original sister station to KRDO (AM). That FM station signed on in 1969 broadcasting a beautiful music format. In 1994, KRDO-FM dropped easy listening music and flipped to adult contemporary music, using the moniker "Peak 95.1". In 1998, KRDO-FM evolved into a hot AC format, which it maintained until Citadel Broadcasting (now Cumulus Media) took over operations of the station in the early 2000s. When the then Citadel–owned station gave up the KRDO-FM call letters in 2006 and became KATC-FM, Optima and NPG acquired the call sign for 105.5.
