= WMYG-LP =

Television station in Lake City, Florida (1985–2015)

- Lake City–Gainesville, Florida; United States
- City: Lake City, Florida
- Channels: Analog: 11 (VHF)
- Branding: My 11 Gainesville

Programming
- Affiliations: As WGFL repeater: The WB (primary, 1997–2002); UPN (secondary, 1997–2002); CBS (2002–2006); As stand-alone station: MyNetworkTV (2006–2015)

Ownership
- Owner: New Age Media, LLC; (New Age Media of Gainesville License, LLC)
- Operator: Sinclair Broadcast Group via master service agreement
- Sister stations: WGFL, WNBW-DT, WYME-CD

History
- First air date: July 3, 1985
- Last air date: November 18, 2015; (30 years, 138 days); (license canceled)
- Former call signs: W15AG (1985–2001); WJXE-LP (2001–2002); WBFL-LP (2002–2003); WLCF-LP (2003–2006)
- Former channel numbers: 15 (UHF, 1985–2002)
- Call sign meaning: MyNetworkTV Gainesville

Technical information
- Licensing authority: FCC
- Facility ID: 47483
- Class: TX
- ERP: 3 kW
- HAAT: 140 m (459 ft)
- Transmitter coordinates: 30°12′50″N 82°39′0″W

Links
- Public license information: LMS

WMYG-LP (channel 11) was a low-power television station in Lake City, Florida, United States, which operated from 1985 to 2015. Last owned by New Age Media, it was most recently affiliated with MyNetworkTV. It was functionally replaced by a digital subchannel of co-owned, High Springs–licensed CBS affiliate WGFL (channel 28). WMYG-LP was also sister to two Gainesville-licensed stations: low-power, Class A Antenna TV affiliate WYME-CD (channel 45) and full-power NBC affiliate WNBW-DT (channel 9). The latter is actually owned by MPS Media but operated by New Age Media under a local marketing agreement (LMA). All of the stations, in turn, are operated under a master service agreement by Sinclair Broadcast Group. WMYG-LP's operations were based at the shared studios of WGFL and WNBW-DT on Northwest 80th Boulevard (along I-75/SR 93) in Gainesville; its transmitter was located in Lake City's Lacymark section.

WMYG-LP did not operate a digital signal of its own, and there were no plans to convert the station's signal to digital. In addition, the analog signal's broadcast range was limited to the immediate Lake City area. However, WMYG-LP received full-market coverage via WGFL-DT2, which eventually became its permanent over-the-air conduit. Ever since its inception, WGFL-DT2 had broadcast in 480i 4:3 standard definition; however, sometime during spring 2017, it had been upgraded to 1080i 16:9 high definition.

The broadcast license for WMYG-LP was canceled on November 18, 2015; its programming continues under WGFL's license as "My 11" (referring to its channel position on most cable systems in the market).

The Gainesville market is located between several other Florida DMAs. In these areas, local cable systems opted instead for the affiliate for their home market instead of WMYG-LP. This includes Cox and Charter Spectrum in Ocala (part of the Orlando market) that both offer WRBW. In Lake City (part of the Jacksonville market), Comcast Xfinity provided WFOX-DT2 in lieu of WMYG, which was technically a station local to Lake City.

== History ==
WMYG-LP signed-on July 3, 1985, airing an analog signal on UHF channel 15 with the call sign W15AG. In 1997, after WGFL launched as a primary WB and secondary UPN affiliate, this station began serving as a repeater of that station. W15AG upgraded to low-power and changed its call sign to WJXE-LP in 2001. In 2002, it switched calls again to WBFL-LP and moved to VHF channel 11. Also that year, Jacksonville's longtime CBS affiliate WJXT became an independent station. During its tenure with the network, that station served as the default affiliate for much of North Central Florida.

WGFL quickly joined CBS to keep the network available in Gainesville. It also changed its on-air moniker from "WB 53" to "CBS 4" (named after the cable channel number on Cox systems). Corresponding with the network change, WGFL began broadcasting a digital signal on UHF channel 28. A second digital subchannel was established to continue a primary WB (through The WB 100+) and secondary UPN affiliation. This used the calls "WBFL" in a fictional manner (to match off-air analog channel 11) and was known on-air as "WB 10" after the cable channel location on Cox.

On January 24, 2006, UPN and The WB announced the two networks would cease broadcasting and merge. The new combined operation would be called The CW. The letters would represent the first initial of corporate parents: CBS (the parent company of UPN) and the Warner Bros. unit of Time Warner. On February 22, News Corporation announced it would start up another new network called MyNetworkTV. This new service, which would be a sister network to Fox, would be operated by Fox Television Stations and its syndication division Twentieth Television.

MyNetworkTV was created in order to give UPN and WB stations, not mentioned as becoming CW affiliates, another option besides becoming independent. It was also created to compete against The CW. On September 5, WMYG became a separate station and joined MyNetworkTV. The call letters stayed the same since they refer to the network and it became known on-air as "My 11" (again referring to its cable channel).

Meanwhile on September 18, ABC affiliate WCJB-TV added a new second digital subchannel of its own to be part of The CW provided through The CW Plus. WYPN-CA (a Class A repeater of WMYG) changed call letters to WYME-CA and become a separate station affiliated with MeTV. The service is a network designed for digital subchannels offering classic television sitcoms, dramas, and classic commercials from the 1950s through 1980s. WNBW added a second digital subchannel to offer a digital signal of WYME and expand its reach.

On September 25, 2013, New Age Media announced that it would sell most of its stations, including WMYG-LP and WGFL, to the Sinclair Broadcast Group. On October 31, 2014, New Age Media requested the dismissal of its application to sell WMYG-LP; the next day, Sinclair purchased the non-license assets of the stations it planned to buy from New Age Media and began operating them through a master service agreement.

== Translators ==
WMYG-LP previously rebroadcast its signal via the following translator stations:

Station	Channel	VC	Former call signs	Notes
WNFT-LD	15 (UHF digital)	8.1	WNFT-LP (2003–2007)	Now a Bounce TV affiliate
WYPN-CA (Note: WYPN was the former UPN affiliate for the Gainesville market (joining the network on December 1, 2004).)	45 (UHF analog)	N/A	W14CB (1994–1997); WJXE-LP (1997–2001)	Now WYME-CD and an affiliate of Antenna TV

== Newscasts ==
WMYG formerly aired nightly newscasts from GTN News, an operation which is produced by the Independent News Network from its studios located in Little Rock, Arkansas (formerly in Davenport, Iowa), and supplemented by local reporters in the Gainesville area. Initially, newscasts at 7 p.m. and 10 p.m. were offered; the weeknight 7 p.m. newscast only lasted for a few months while the nightly 10 p.m. newscast continued for a few more years until being phased out due to budget cuts in 2014. As of 2025, WGFL-DT2 now runs The National News Desk at 10 p.m.
