= NBC 20 =

NBC 20 may refer to one of the following television stations in the United States:

== Current ==
- WBBH-TV in Fort Myers, Florida
- WBGH-CD in Binghamton, New York

== Former ==
- WCJB-TV in Gainesville, Florida (1971–1973)
- WATR-TV/WTXX (now WCCT-TV) in Waterbury/Hartford/New Haven, Connecticut (1966–1982)
- WICS in Springfield, Illinois (1953–2005)
