= NBC 9 =

NBC 9 may refer to one of the following television stations in the United States:

== Current ==
- KCFW-TV in Kalispell, Montana
- KRBC-TV in Abilene, Texas
- KTSM-TV in El Paso, Texas
- KUSA (TV) in Denver, Colorado
- KWES-TV in Midland/Odessa, Texas
- WGFL-DT3, a digital channel of WGFL in High Springs/Gainesville, Florida (branded as NBC 9)
- WTOV-TV in Steubenville, Ohio/Wheeling, West Virginia
- WTVA in Tupelo/Columbus, Mississippi

== Former ==
- KCEN-TV in Waco/Temple, Texas (2009–2010; now back on channel 6)
- KFOY-TV in Hot Springs, Arkansas (1961–1963)
- KTRE in Lufkin/Nacogdoches, Texas (primary from 1955–1984 and secondary from 1984–1987)
- WNBW-DT in Gainesville, Florida (2008–2025)
- WROM-TV (now WTVC) in Chattanooga, Tennessee (1953–1956)
- WSOC-TV in Charlotte, North Carolina (1957–1978)
