= WWDT =

WWDT may refer to:

- WWDT-CD, a low-power television station (channel 30, virtual 43) licensed to serve Naples, Florida, United States
- WDIV-TV, a television station (channel 45, virtual 4) licensed to serve Detroit, Michigan, United States, which held the call sign WWDT from 1946 to 1947
