= Channel 9 virtual TV stations in the United States =

The following television stations operate on virtual channel 9 in the United States:

- K02AO-D in Eureka, Montana
- K02EE-D in Weaverville, California
- K02IK-D in Gateview, Colorado
- K03HX-D in Etna, California
- K04IH-D in Baker, Montana
- K04OS-D in Reedsport, Oregon
- K04RP-D in Delta Junction, Alaska
- K05CR-D in Hayfork, California
- K05FC-D in Lake McDonald, Montana
- K07JS-D in North Bend, Oregon
- K08OB-D in Newell, California
- K08OV-D in Nenana, Alaska
- K09NH-D in Shungnak, Alaska
- K09NI-D in Mekoryuk, Alaska
- K09NK-D in Perryville, Alaska
- K09NO-D in Pilot Point, Alaska
- K09OT-D in Valdez, Alaska
- K09OV-D in Kotzebue, Alaska
- K09OW-D in Nome, Alaska
- K09PC-D in Grayling, Alaska
- K09PO-D in Chevak, Alaska
- K09QC-D in McGrath, Alaska
- K09QG-D in Chalkyitsik, Alaska
- K09QK-D in Karluk, Alaska
- K09QM-D in Nelson Lagoon, Alaska
- K09QP-D in Kake, Alaska
- K09QR-D in Gambell, Alaska
- K09QU-D in Togiak, Alaska
- K09QW-D in King Cove, Alaska
- K09QX-D in St. Michael, Alaska
- K09RA-D in Sand Point, Alaska
- K09RB-D in St. Paul, Alaska
- K09RC-D in Unalakleet, Alaska
- K09RE-D in St. George, Alaska
- K09RF-D in Eagle Village, Alaska
- K09RP-D in False Pass, Alaska
- K09SA-D in Koyuk, Alaska
- K09SG-D in Goodnews Bay, Alaska
- K09SL-D in Kotlik, Alaska
- K09SP-D in Igiugig, Alaska
- K09SR-D in Port Lions, Alaska
- K09TK-D in Elfin Cove, Alaska
- K09TR-D in Kalskag, Alaska
- K09TT-D in Circle, Alaska
- K09TW-D in Venetie, Alaska
- K09TX-D in Kaltag, Alaska
- K09XW-D in Palm Desert, etc., California
- K09YK-D in Durango/Purgatory, Colorado
- K09YW-D in Leamington, Utah
- K09ZN-D in Blanding/Monticello, Utah
- K09ZO-D in Juab, Utah
- K09ZT-D in Beaver, Utah
- K09AAF-D in Monterey, California
- K10RF-D in Long Valley Junction, Utah
- K10RN-D in Helper, Utah
- K11BX-D in Sutherlin, Oregon
- K11GT-D in Eugene, Oregon
- K11KI-D in Dorena, etc., Oregon
- K11XC-D in Salina & Redmond, Utah
- K11XE-D in Marysvale, Utah
- K11XL-D in Roosevelt, etc., Utah
- K13AAE-D in Healy, Alaska
- K14HX-D in Lakehead, California
- K14NM-D in Anton & SW Wash County, Colorado
- K14OA-D in Preston, Idaho
- K15IA-D in Orderville, Utah
- K15IF-D in Basalt, Colorado
- K15JG-D in Scottsburg, Oregon
- K15LI-D in Sterling, Colorado
- K15LP-D in Rural Carbon County, Utah
- K16BO-D in Milford, etc., Utah
- K16IB-D in Mount Pleasant, Utah
- K16NS-D in Redstone, Colorado
- K17JK-D in Cane Beds, Arizona/Hildale, Utah
- K17KB-D in Belgrade, etc., Montana
- K17MV-D in Richfield, etc., Utah
- K17OB-D in Plevna, Montana
- K18CR-D in Circle, etc., Montana
- K18GM-D in Pleasant Valley, Colorado
- K18KD-D in Libby, Montana
- K18KH-D in Julesburg, Colorado
- K18MB-D in International Falls, Minnesota
- K18MF-D in Torrey, etc., Utah
- K18MG-D in Panguitch, Utah
- K18ML-D in Henrieville, Utah
- K18MM-D in Rural Sevier County, Utah
- K18MN-D in Koosharem, Utah
- K18MT-D in Cedar City, Utah
- K18ND-D in Chico and Paradise, California
- K18NG-D in McDermitt, Nevada
- K19GL-D in Yreka, California
- K19ID-D in Green River, Utah
- K19LG-D in Rural Garfield County, Utah
- K19LJ-D in Frost, Minnesota
- K19LN-D in Mayfield, Utah
- K19LV-D in St. George, Utah
- K19LW-D in Sterling, Colorado
- K19MD-D in Orangeville, Utah
- K20DE-D in Alturas/Likely, California
- K20IJ-D in Wauneta, Nebraska
- K20NN-D in Scipio, Utah
- K21JN-D in Erick, Oklahoma
- K21MT-D in Seiling, Oklahoma
- K21NH-D in Laketown, etc., Utah
- K21NI-D in Wendover, Utah
- K21OI-D in McCook/Culbertson, Nebraska
- K22CQ-D in Idalia, Colorado
- K22DM-D in Rural Summit County, Utah
- K22LD-D in Chinook, Montana
- K22MB-D in Roseburg, Oregon
- K22MU-D in Circleville, Utah
- K23DJ-D in Ekalaka, Montana
- K23FO-D in Jackson, Minnesota
- K23FT-D in Myton, Utah
- K23JX-D in Hatch, Utah
- K23ME-D in Camas Valley, Oregon
- K23MF-D in St. James, Minnesota
- K24ID-D in Fernadle, Montana
- K24IP-D in Huntington, Utah
- K24LY-D in Cottage Grove, Oregon
- K24MP-D in Butte, Montana
- K24MS-D in Roseau, Minnesota
- K24NZ-D in Carbondale, Colorado
- K25GZ-D in Holyoke, Colorado
- K25LH-D in Fishlake Resort, Utah
- K25MW-D in Baudette, Minnesota
- K25NI-D in Mapleton, Oregon
- K25PL-D in Ridgecrest, California
- K26MW-D in Lucerne Valley, California
- K26NZ-D in Kanarraville/New Harmony, Utah
- K27CD-D in Boulder, Montana
- K27CL-D in Coos Bay/North Bend, Oregon
- K27FI-D in Frost, Minnesota
- K27HR-D in Manti & Ephraim, Utah
- K27LO-D in Emigrant, Montana
- K27MY-D in Altus, Oklahoma
- K27NG-D in Fountain Green, Utah
- K27NK-D in Parowan, Enoch, etc., Utah
- K27NM-D in Delta, etc., Utah
- K27OP-D in Oro Valley/Tucson, Arizona
- K28CY-D in Lewiston, California
- K28DB-D in Fall River Mills, California
- K28KN-D in Emery, Utah
- K28OP-D in Boulder, Utah
- K28OR-D in Caineville, Utah
- K29ID-D in Weeksville, Montana
- K29IV-D in Fremont, Utah
- K29KE-D in Big Falls, Minnesota
- K30PD-D in Kanab, Utah
- K30PF-D in Fillmore etc., Utah
- K30PJ-D in Beryl/New Castle/Modena, Utah
- K30PM-D in Price, Utah
- K31EL-D in Tropic, etc., Utah
- K31KP-D in Alton, Utah
- K31PI-D in London Springs, Oregon
- K32EX-D in Peetz, Colorado
- K32MH-D in Washington, etc., Utah
- K32MK-D in Park City, Utah
- K32MU-D in Hanksville, Utah
- K32MV-D in Antimony, Utah
- K32NG-D in Green River, Utah
- K32NH-D in Ferron, Utah
- K32OK-D in Woody Creek, Colorado
- K32OX-D in Lucerne Valley, California
- K33DO-D in Vernal, Utah
- K33FO-D in Benkelman, Nebraska
- K33KH-D in Nephi, Utah
- K33PD-D in Toquerville, Hurricane, Utah
- K33PS-D in Randolph, Utah
- K34DP-D in Plevna, Montana
- K34FV-D in Duchesne, Utah
- K34JJ-D in Hollis, Oklahoma
- K34KL-D in Powers, Oregon
- K34NU-D in Jackson, Minnesota
- K34NY-D in Escalante, Utah
- K34PF-D in Scofield, Utah
- K34PW-D in Haxtun, Colorado
- K35HW-D in Florence, Oregon
- K35KL-D in Manila, etc., Utah
- K35MY-D in Birchdale, Minnesota
- K35ND-D in Rural Garfield, etc., Utah
- K36JT-D in Clear Creek, Utah
- K36JV-D in East Price, Utah
- K36NQ-D in Altus, Oklahoma
- K36NX-D in Pringle, South Dakota
- K36OA-D in Red Lake, Minnesota
- K36OL-D in Willmar, Minnesota
- K36OR-D in Logan, Utah
- KAWE in Bemidji, Minnesota
- KBHE-TV in Rapid City, South Dakota
- KCAL-TV in Los Angeles, California
- KCAU-TV in Sioux City, Iowa
- KCFW-TV in Kalispell, Montana
- KCRG-TV in Cedar Rapids, Iowa
- KCTS-TV in Seattle, Washington
- KDSE in Dickinson, North Dakota
- KECY-TV in El Centro, California
- KEFM-LD in Sacramento, California
- KETC in St. Louis, Missouri
- KETG in Arkadelphia, Arkansas
- KEZI in Eugene, Oregon
- KGMD-TV in Hilo, Hawaii
- KGUN-TV in Tucson, Arizona
- KHII-TV in Honolulu, Hawaii
- KIXE-TV in Redding, California
- KLRN in San Antonio, Texas
- KMBC-TV in Kansas City, Missouri
- KMSP-TV in Minneapolis, Minnesota
- KNIN-TV in Caldwell, Idaho
- KOOD in Hays, Kansas
- KPNE-TV in North Platte, Nebraska
- KQED in San Francisco, California
- KRBC-TV in Abilene, Texas
- KSDX-LD in San Diego, California
- KTRE in Lufkin, Texas
- KTSM-TV in El Paso, Texas
- KUAC-TV in Fairbanks, Alaska
- KUEN in Ogden, Utah
- KUSA in Denver, Colorado
- KUSM-TV in Bozeman, Montana
- KWES-TV in Odessa, Texas
- KWTV-DT in Oklahoma City, Oklahoma
- KXLH-LD in Helena, Montana
- W27EI-D in Moorefield, West Virginia
- W28DR-D in Cedarville, West Virginia
- W29DP-D in Welch, West Virginia
- W32EG-D in Williams, Minnesota
- WAFB in Baton Rouge, Louisiana
- WAOW in Wausau, Wisconsin
- WBON-LD in Richmond, Kentucky
- WCPO-TV in Cincinnati, Ohio
- WCTA-LD in Columbus, Georgia
- WFTC in Minneapolis, Minnesota
- WFTV in Orlando, Florida
- WGN-TV in Chicago, Illinois
- WHDT in Stuart, Florida
- WJKF-CD in Jacksonville, Florida
- WMUR-TV in Manchester, New Hampshire
- WNBW-DT in Gainesville, Florida
- WNCT-TV in Greenville, North Carolina
- WNGG-LD in Gouverneur, New York
- WNIN in Evansville, Indiana
- WNSH-LD in Nashville, Tennessee
- WPVS-LD in Milwaukee, Wisconsin
- WQWQ-LD in Paducah, Kentucky
- WSOC-TV in Charlotte, North Carolina
- WSUR-DT in Ponce, Puerto Rico
- WSWP-TV in Grandview, West Virginia
- WSYR-TV in Syracuse, New York
- WTOV-TV in Steubenville, Ohio
- WTVA in Tupelo, Mississippi
- WTVC in Chattanooga, Tennessee
- WTVM in Columbus, Georgia
- WUSA in Washington, D.C.
- WVAN-TV in Savannah, Georgia
- WWOR-TV in Secaucus, New Jersey
- WWTV in Cadillac, Michigan
- WXON-LD in Flint, Michigan

The following stations, which are no longer licensed, formerly operated on virtual channel 9:

- K07IA-D in Oakland, Oregon
- K08OR-D in Canby, California
- K09BJ-D in Entiat, Washington
- K09CL-D in Rock Island, Washington
- K09FF-D in Squilchuck St. Park, Washington
- K09QD-D in Huslia, Alaska
- K09QE-D in Larsen Bay, Alaska
- K09QL-D in Allakaket, Alaska
- K09RG-D in Kongiganak, Alaska
- K09RV-D in Arctic Village, Alaska
- K09SO-D in Chignik Lagoon, Alaska
- K09TM-D in Kakhonak, Alaska
- K09UB-D in Whittier, Alaska
- K09YQ-D in Ketchikan, Alaska
- K12AA-D in Troy, Montana
- K19FH-D in Aspen, Colorado
- K29JW-D in Granite Falls, Minnesota
- K31GK-D in Ukiah, California
- K34IV-D in Fruitland, Utah
- K36QI-D in Quartz Creek, etc., Montana
- K39DG-D in Trinity Center, California
- K42LH-D in Winston, Oregon
- KABY-TV in Aberdeen, South Dakota
- WLDW-LD in Myrtle Beach, South Carolina
- WLEP-LD in Erie, Pennsylvania
