= Channel 8 digital TV stations in the United States =

The following television stations broadcast on digital channel 8 in the United States:

- K08AK-D in Port Orford, etc., Oregon
- K08AP-D in Pateros/Mansfield, Washington
- K08AY-D in Winthrop-Twisp, Washington
- K08BO-D in Virgin, Utah
- K08CB-D in Lund & Preston, Nevada
- K08CW-D in Malott/Wakefield, Washington
- K08CX-D in Tonasket, Washington
- K08CY-D in Riverside, Washington
- K08EN-D in Pine Valley, etc., Utah
- K08ET-D in Durango, Colorado
- K08EZ-D in Mink Creek, Idaho, on virtual channel 3, which rebroadcasts KIDK
- K08FS-D in Dodson, Montana
- K08HU-D in Aleknagik, Alaska
- K08IO-D in Wells, Nevada
- K08IP-D in Baker, Montana
- K08JP-D in Dryden, Washington
- K08JV-D in Broadus, Montana
- K08KA-D in Girdwood, Alaska
- K08KD-D in Alakanuk, Alaska
- K08KO-D in Cooper Landing, Alaska
- K08KT-D in Boulder, Montana
- K08KW-D in Richland, Oregon
- K08LG-D in Silver Lake, etc., Oregon
- K08LI-D in White Sulphur Springs, Montana
- K08LL-D in Dolores, Colorado
- K08LN-D in Harrison, Nebraska
- K08LS-D in Elko, Nevada
- K08MB-D in Weber Canyon, Colorado
- K08ND-D in Akron, Colorado, on virtual channel 9, which rebroadcasts KUSA
- K08NQ-D in Ryndon, Nevada
- K08OB-D in Newell, California
- K08OU-D in Seattle, Washington, on virtual channel 8
- K08OV-D in Nenana, Alaska
- K08OW-D in Hysham, Montana
- K08OX-D in Thomasville, Colorado
- K08OY-D in Plains, Montana
- K08OZ-D in Trout Creek, etc., Montana
- K08PC-D in Hildale, etc., Utah
- K08PE-D in Alamo, etc., Nevada
- K08PF-D in Leamington, Utah
- K08PG-D in Indian Springs, Nevada
- K08PI-D in Salmon, Montana
- K08PJ-D in Cedar City, Utah, on virtual channel 12, which rebroadcasts KMYU
- K08PK-D in Bullhead City, Arizona
- K08PM-D in Wagner, South Dakota
- K08PN-D in Homer, etc., Alaska
- K08PP-D in Rosebud, etc., Montana
- K08PQ-D in Big Arm/Elmo, Montana
- K08PR-D in Missoula, Montana
- K08PT-D in Bakersfield, California
- K08PW-D in Laketown, etc., Utah, on virtual channel 7, which rebroadcasts KUED
- K08PX-D in Long Valley Junction, Utah
- K08PY-D in Blanding/Monticello, Utah
- K08PZ-D in Corvallis, Oregon
- K08QA-D in Aurora, etc., Utah
- K08QB-D in Crouch/Garden Valley, Idaho
- K08QC-D in Sigurd & Salina, Utah
- K08QD-D in Woodland & Kamas, Utah
- K08QE-D in Fergus Falls, Minnesota
- K08QF-D in East Price, Utah, on virtual channel 4, which rebroadcasts KTVX
- K08QG-D in Helper, Utah
- K08QH-D in Roosevelt, etc., Utah, on virtual channel 4, which rebroadcasts KTVX
- K08QL-D in Logan, Utah, on virtual channel 8, which rebroadcasts KCSG
- K08QM-D in Wendover, Utah
- K08QN-D in Golden Valley, Arizona
- K08QP-D in Silver City, New Mexico
- KAET in Phoenix, Arizona, on virtual channel 8
- KAKM in Anchorage, Alaska
- KBNI-LD in Santa Maria, California
- KCCI in Des Moines, Iowa
- KCWC-DT in Lander, Wyoming
- KEET in Hoopa, California
- KESD-TV in Brookings, South Dakota
- KFBB-TV in Great Falls, Montana
- KFLA-LD in Los Angeles, California, on virtual channel 8
- KFMB-TV in San Diego, California, on virtual channel 8
- KGNS-TV in Laredo, Texas
- KHON-TV in Honolulu, Hawaii
- KIFI-TV in Idaho Falls, Idaho
- KIII in Corpus Christi, Texas
- KILA-LD in Cherry Valley, California, on virtual channel 8, which rebroadcasts KFLA-LD
- KJRH-TV in Tulsa, Oklahoma
- KLKN in Lincoln, Nebraska
- KNMD-TV in Santa Fe, New Mexico, an ATSC 3.0 station
- KNOE-TV in Monroe, Louisiana
- KOBR in Roswell, New Mexico
- KOLO-TV in Reno, Nevada
- KPSW-LD in Boise, Idaho
- KPTS in Hutchinson, Kansas
- KPTW in Casper, Wyoming
- KQSL in Fort Bragg, California, on virtual channel 8
- KSBW in Salinas, California
- KSWK in Lakin, Kansas
- KSYS in Medford, Oregon
- KTSC in Pueblo, Colorado
- KUAM-TV in Hagåtña, Guam
- KUCB-LD in Dutch Harbor, Alaska
- KUHT in Houston, Texas, on virtual channel 8
- KUMV-TV in Williston, North Dakota
- KUSM-TV in Bozeman, Montana
- KVFR-LD in Redding, California
- KVPS-LD in Indio, California
- KWCZ-LD in Sunnyside-Grandview, Washington
- KWET in Cheyenne, Oklahoma
- KWVC-LD in Malaga, etc., Washington
- KWYP-DT in Laramie, Wyoming
- KXMP-LD in Harrison, Arkansas
- KZDF-LD in Santa Barbara, California
- KZSD-TV in Martin, South Dakota
- W08AT-D in Cherokee, North Carolina
- W08BF-D in Spruce Pine, North Carolina, on virtual channel 7, which rebroadcasts WSPA-TV
- W08EH-D in Ponce, Puerto Rico, on virtual channel 8
- W08EI-D in Guaynabo, Puerto Rico, on virtual channel 8
- W08EJ-D in Anasco, Puerto Rico, on virtual channel 8
- W08EQ-D in Tallahassee, Florida
- WAGM-TV in Presque Isle, Maine
- WBNA in Louisville, Kentucky
- WBNG-TV in Binghamton, New York
- WDAZ-TV in Devil's Lake, North Dakota
- WDEF-TV in Chattanooga, Tennessee
- WDHS in Iron Mountain, Michigan
- WDSE in Duluth, Minnesota
- WFAA in Dallas, Texas, on virtual channel 8
- WGAL in Lancaster, Pennsylvania
- WGCT-CD in Columbus, Ohio, on virtual channel 39, which rebroadcasts WOCB-CD
- WGEN-LD in Miami, Florida, on virtual channel 8, which rebroadcasts WGEN-TV
- WGEN-TV in Key West, Florida, on virtual channel 8
- WGSC-CD in Murrells Inlet, South Carolina
- WGSI-CD in Murrells Inlet, South Carolina, uses WGSC-CD's spectrum
- WGTQ in Sault Ste. Marie, Michigan
- WIGL-LD in Athens, Georgia, on virtual channel 38
- WIIH-CD in Indianapolis, Indiana, on virtual channel 17
- WJW in Cleveland, Ohio, on virtual channel 8
- WKBT-DT in La Crosse, Wisconsin
- WLIO in Lima, Ohio
- WMAB-TV in Mississippi State, Mississippi
- WMTW in Poland Spring, Maine
- WMVS in Milwaukee, Wisconsin, on virtual channel 10
- WMVT in Milwaukee, Wisconsin, uses WMVS' spectrum, on virtual channel 36
- WMWC-TV in Galesburg, Illinois
- WNBW-DT in Gainesville, Florida
- WNCN in Goldsboro, North Carolina, on virtual channel 17
- WNJB in New Brunswick, New Jersey, on virtual channel 58
- WNJN in Montclair, New Jersey, which uses WNJB's spectrum, on virtual channel 50
- WNMU in Marquette, Michigan
- WNTV in Greenville, South Carolina, on virtual channel 29
- WOFT-LD in Ocala, Florida, on virtual channel 8
- WRET-TV in Spartanburg, South Carolina, uses WNTV's spectrum, on virtual channel 49
- WSFA in Montgomery, Alabama
- WSIU-TV in Carbondale, Illinois
- WSWP-TV in Grandview, West Virginia
- WUDT-LD in Detroit, Michigan
- WUPV in Ashland, Virginia
- WVAN-TV in Savannah, Georgia
- WVFW-LD in Miami, Florida, on virtual channel 8, which rebroadcasts WGEN-TV
- WVMY-LD in Parkersburg, West Virginia
- WVNS-TV in Lewisburg, West Virginia
- WWCP-TV in Johnstown, Pennsylvania
- WWMT in Kalamazoo, Michigan
- WWNY-TV in Carthage, New York
- WWVW-LD in Wheeling, West Virginia
- WXOD-LD in Palm Beach, Florida
- WXXA-TV in Albany, New York

The following stations, which are no longer licensed, formerly broadcast on digital channel 8:

- K08AX-D in Ardenvoir, Washington
- K08BA-D in Orondo, etc., Washington
- K08BG-D in Troy, Montana
- K08HN-D in Aspen, Colorado
- K08ID-D in Tuluksak, Alaska
- K08JZ-D in Waunita Hot Springs, Colorado
- K08LW-D in Kenai/Soldotna, Alaska
- K08NP-D in John Day, Oregon
- K08OR-D in Canby, California
- K08QJ-D in Rio Grande City, Texas
- W08ED-D in Marathon, Florida
- WFXI in Morehead City, North Carolina
