= WNBW =

WNBW may refer to:

- WNBW-DT, a television station (channel 8, virtual 9) licensed to serve Gainesville, Florida, United States
- WRC-TV, a television station (channel 34, virtual 4) licensed to serve Washington, DC, United States, which at one time held the WNBW call letters
