= WYME-CD =

Television station in Gainesville, Florida

- Gainesville, Florida; United States
- Channels: Digital: 27 (UHF); Virtual: 45

Programming
- Affiliations: 45.1: Antenna TV

Ownership
- Owner: Sinclair Broadcast Group; (WGFL License, LLC)
- Sister stations: WGFL, WNBW-DT

History
- Founded: June 20, 1994
- First air date: December 10, 1996
- Former call signs: W14CB (1994–1997); WJXE-LP (1997–2001); WYPN-CA (2001–2011); WYME-CA (2011–2015)
- Former channel numbers: Analog: 14 (UHF, 1994–2001), 43 (UHF, 2001–2003), 45 (UHF, 2003–2015); Digital: 45 (UHF, 2015–2020)
- Former affiliations: America One (1996–2002); CBS (satellite of WGFL, 2002–2004); UPN (2004–2006); MyNetworkTV (satellite of WMYG, 2006–2011); MeTV (2011–2018)
- Call sign meaning: MeTV (former affiliation)

Technical information
- Licensing authority: FCC
- Facility ID: 7726
- Class: CD
- ERP: 5.5 kW
- HAAT: 237.6 m (780 ft)
- Transmitter coordinates: 29°37′47.7″N 82°34′24″W
- Translator(s): WNBW-DT 9.4 Gainesville

Links
- Public license information: Public file; LMS

WYME-CD (channel 45) is a low-power, Class A television station in Gainesville, Florida, United States, affiliated with Antenna TV. It is owned by Sinclair Broadcast Group alongside WNBW-DT (channel 9) and CBS/MyNetworkTV/NBC affiliate WGFL (channel 28). The three stations share studios on Northwest 80th Boulevard (along I-75/SR 93) in Gainesville and transmitter facilities on Southwest 30th Avenue near Newberry.

Even though WYME-CD broadcasts a digital signal of its own, its broadcast range is limited to the immediate Gainesville area. However, it receives full-market over-the-air coverage via WNBW's fourth digital subchannel (9.4).

== History ==
WYME was founded on June 20, 1994, and began operations on December 10, 1996, as W14CB, broadcasting on UHF channel 14. In early 1997, the station increased its power and changed its call letters to WJXE-LP. During this period, the station was known on-air as "TV-14" and mainly aired programming from the America One television network.

WJXE changed its callsign to WYPN-CA in 2001, when the station upgraded to Class A service and started broadcasting on UHF channel 43 (moving to channel 45 in 2003). About a year later, the America One programming was dropped and WYPN became a satellite of sister station WGFL on July 15, 2002, the same day the latter station became a CBS affiliate. This arrangement lasted until December 1, 2004, when WYPN gained the UPN affiliation and became a separate station. WYPN then positioned itself as "UPN 11", choosing to identify by its cable channel number despite broadcasting over-the-air on channel 45.

When the UPN and WB networks merged to form The CW in 2006, WYPN was made a satellite of Lake City sister station WMYG-LP, which became an affiliate of the new MyNetworkTV programming service on September 5, 2006. This arrangement was done primarily due to WMYG's over-the-air signal being channel 11 (the same as WYPN's cable number). In the months prior to the switch, WYPN omitted "UPN" from their logo and on-screen graphics and re-branded itself as "WYPN 11".

Five years later, on May 3, 2011, WYPN became an affiliate of the MeTV network. To reflect the new affiliation, the station changed its call letters to WYME-CA. This time, the station did not go by its channel number, instead simply identifying itself as "MeTV Gainesville".

On September 25, 2013, New Age Media announced that it would sell most of its stations, including the then WYME-CA, WGFL, and WMYG-LP, to the Sinclair Broadcast Group. Concurrently, MPS Media planned to sell WNBW-DT to Cunningham Broadcasting, though Sinclair would still operate that station. On October 31, 2014, New Age Media requested the dismissal of its application to sell WYME-CA; the next day, Sinclair purchased the non-license assets of the stations it planned to buy from New Age Media and began operating them through a master service agreement.

On May 28, 2025, Sinclair announced that it would acquire WYME and WGFL outright. The sale was completed on August 1.

== Subchannel ==
Subchannel of WYME-CD
Channel	Res.	Short name	Programming
45.1	480i	WYME-CD	Antenna TV
