= Channel 20 virtual TV stations in the United States =

The following television stations operate on virtual channel 20 in the United States:

- K02QI-D in Hesperus, Colorado
- K02RL-D in Indio, California
- K09XL-D in Douglas, Wyoming
- K11UW-D in Akron, Colorado
- K14RW-D in Grants Pass, Oregon
- K16NH-D in Wray, Colorado
- K20AC-D in Alexandria, Minnesota
- K20DN-D in Wichita Falls, Texas
- K20HB-D in Billings, Montana
- K20IT-D in Boise City, Oklahoma
- K20JS-D in Glasgow, Montana
- K20KJ-D in Bryan, Texas
- K20KV-D in Medford, Oregon
- K20KW-D in Saint Cloud, Minnesota
- K20LP-D in St. James, Minnesota
- K20LQ-D in Yakima, Washington
- K20OL-D in Fort Smith, Arkansas
- K20OO-D in Ceres, California
- K20PB-D in Williston, North Dakota
- K21OM-D in Lafayette, Louisiana
- K22MD-D in Anderson/Central Valley, California
- K24EZ-D in Idalia, Colorado
- K25QT-D in Columbia, Missouri
- K26PQ-D in Oroville, California
- K28FW-D in Peetz, Colorado
- K28IX-D in Pleasant Valley, Colorado
- K30HA-D in Yuma, Colorado
- K33ON-D in Fort Peck, Montana
- K36IH-D in Ignacio, Colorado
- KADF-LD in Austin, Texas
- KBOP-LD in Dallas-Fort Worth, Texas
- KCVU in Paradise, California
- KEFN-CD in St. Louis, Missouri
- KFKY-LD in Springfield, Missouri
- KFLU-LD in Fayetteville, Arkansas
- KFNB in Casper, Wyoming
- KIKU in Honolulu, Hawaii
- KLML in Grand Junction, Colorado
- KLML-LD in Grand Junction, Colorado
- KLRA-CD in Little Rock, Arkansas
- KNLA-CD in Los Angeles, California
- KNMQ-LD in Albuquerque, New Mexico
- KOFY-TV in San Francisco, California
- KOXI-CD in Portland, Oregon
- KQRE-LD in Bend, Oregon
- KRMU in Durango, Colorado
- KRTX-LP in San Antonio, Texas
- KSMN in Worthington, Minnesota
- KSZG-LD in Aspen, Colorado
- KTBW-TV in Tacoma, Washington
- KTLE-LD in Odessa, Texas
- KTMW in Salt Lake City, Utah
- KTVD in Denver, Colorado
- KTXH in Houston, Texas
- KUKC-LD in Kansas City, Missouri
- KVME-TV in Bishop, California
- KWKB in Iowa City, Iowa
- KWYF-LD in Casper, Wyoming
- KZTN-LD in Boise, Idaho
- KZUP-CD in Baton Rouge, Louisiana
- W14EU-D in Tallahassee, Florida
- W20DL-D in Macon, Georgia
- W20DT-D in Vanderbilt, Michigan
- W20DX-D in Panama City, Florida
- W20DY-D in Roanoke, West Virginia
- W20EM-D in New Bern, North Carolina
- W20EQ-D in Athens, Georgia
- W20ER-D in Bangor, Maine
- W20EV-D in Houghton Lake, Michigan
- W20EY-D in Wilmington, North Carolina
- W29ET-D in Coloma, Wisconsin
- W32FE-D in Hartwell & Royston, Georgia
- WARP-CD in Tampa-St. Petersburg, Florida
- WBBH-TV in Fort Myers, Florida
- WBII-CD in Holly Springs, Mississippi
- WBSE-LD in Charleston, South Carolina
- WBXX-TV in Crossville, Tennessee
- WCCT-TV in Waterbury, Connecticut
- WCES-TV in Wrens, Georgia
- WCGZ-LD in Lanett, Alabama
- WCJB-TV in Gainesville, Florida
- WCOV-TV in Montgomery, Alabama
- WCWG in Lexington, North Carolina
- WDCA in Washington, D.C.
- WFYI in Indianapolis, Indiana
- WFYI-LD in Indianapolis, Indiana
- WHNO in New Orleans, Louisiana
- WHRM-TV in Wausau, Wisconsin
- WICS in Springfield, Illinois
- WIMN-CD in Arecibo, Puerto Rico
- WKPV in Ponce, Puerto Rico
- WLWD-LD in Dayton, Ohio
- WMYD in Detroit, Michigan
- WNGJ-LD in Ogdensburg, New York
- WOUB-TV in Athens, Ohio
- WQDI-LD in Canton, Ohio
- WSJN-CD in San Juan, Puerto Rico
- WTSN-CD in Evansville, Indiana
- WUTR in Utica, New York
- WVTB in St. Johnsbury, Vermont
- WWHC-LD in Olean, New York
- WWLM-CD in Washington, Pennsylvania

The following stations, which are no longer licensed, formerly operated on virtual channel 20:

- K20IM-D in Barstow, California
- K20KI-D in Rapid City, South Dakota
- K25LT-D in Cortez, Colorado
- K27EE-D in Ukiah, California
- KAKH-LD in Lufkin, Texas
- WCZC-LD in Augusta, Georgia
- WDUE-LD in Eau Claire, Wisconsin
- WDZA-LD in Wilmington, North Carolina
- WOTH-CD in Cincinnati, Ohio
- WUWB-LD in West Branch, Michigan
- WYCC in Chicago, Illinois
