= Jan Jeffcoat =

American television personality (born 1980)

- Born: 1978 (age 47–48); Columbia, South Carolina
- Education: University of South Carolina, College of Journalism and Mass Communications (2000)
- Occupation: Television news anchor
- Employer(s): WUSA (2013-2018); WJLA-TV (2018-present)
- Spouse: Matthew Kingsley
- Children: 2
- Website: janjeffcoat.com

Jan Jeffcoat is an American television personality, currently serving as the lead anchor for The National Desk, a headline news service aired on Sinclair Broadcast Group stations.

== Career ==
Jeffcoat has been a guest star on several television shows including NBC’s This Is Us, Netflix’s “What If”, FOX’s “911”, “Family Time” as well as “Truth Be Told” on Apple TV. She also has appeared as an actress on Lifetime Movie “My Daughter was Stolen”. In November 2019, she appeared in films “In the Line of Duty” and “Mainstream” with director Gia Coppola.

At age twelve she hosted a local children's program in her hometown of Greenville, South Carolina. Her first reporting job was in Tallahassee, Florida. She has worked as a reporter and/or anchor at WBTV in Charlotte, NC and WCSC-TV in Charleston, SC.

Jeffcoat was a morning anchor at KRIV in Houston from November 2004 to June 2007. During her time at KRIV, the morning show became Houston's fastest growing morning news.

Jeffcoat began anchoring Chicago's WFLD-TV on June 25, 2007. Initially, she was co-hosted the "Good Day Chicago" morning program. In August 2010, she was moved up to co-anchor of the station's Noon newscast. She hosted WFLD-TV's Good Day Chicago for three years which won an Illinois AP award for Best Newscast in 2008. She also garnered two local Emmy awards for separate reports.

She and three co anchors launched Scripps' "The List"; a syndicated entertainment show. She left WFLD in 2012. From 2013 - 2018 Jeffocat was a morning and evening TV news anchor for WUSA-TV in Washington, D.C. Since 2018, Jeffcoat has worked for Sinclair Broadcast Group, first for rival station WJLA-TV within Washington, D.C., and since late 2020 for Sinclair's national headline news service The National Desk, which broadcasts from WJLA-TV studios.

=== Awards ===
Jeffcoat has won 5 Emmy awards for her anchoring and reporting in various markets including Chicago as well as a national news magazine show. She won an Edward R. Murrow for her reporting after the earthquakes in Haiti. She was named "Top Houston Professional who's on the fast track" by H-Texas Magazine. During her first month in Houston she covered a collision on the Sam Houston Tollway. Her coverage on the aftermath of that wreck led to a nomination for a Regional Emmy. She also received an Emmy nomination for Best Anchor in Texas in 2006 and 2007 as well as two AP awards for anchoring. In 2005 and 2006, Jeffcoat was nominated for a Star Award by the American Women of Radio and Television for Best On-Air Personality in Houston. She was also named 2010 Outstanding Young Alumni of the Year by her alma mater USC.

== Personal ==
Jeffcoat has stated that her mother is of Japanese descent and her father is part Native American.

In 2003, she married talent agent Matthew Kingsley, Partner of Hollywood agency Paradigm and owner and CEO of 3 Kings Entertainment, LLC. Their first daughter Kana Zen was born in March 2012. In early February 2015, she announced she was pregnant with another child. Her second daughter Kensington Sage was born May 2015.

In 2008, she moved to California when her husband moved his entertainment company there.
