= WCJB-TV =

Television station in Gainesville, Florida

- Gainesville, Florida; United States
- Channels: Digital: 16 (UHF); Virtual: 20
- Branding: WCJB-TV 20; TV 20 News; Gainesville CW (20.2)

Programming
- Affiliations: 20.1: ABC; 20.2: CW+; for others, see § Subchannels

Ownership
- Owner: Gray Media; (Gray Television Licensee, LLC)
- Sister stations: WTGB-LD

History
- First air date: April 7, 1971
- Former channel numbers: Analog: 20 (UHF, 1971–2009)
- Former affiliations: NBC (1971–1973)
- Call sign meaning: Casey, JoAnn, and Bill Minshall, original owners

Technical information
- Licensing authority: FCC
- Facility ID: 16993
- ERP: 343.6 kW
- HAAT: 254.4 m (835 ft)
- Transmitter coordinates: 29°32′11.5″N 82°24′0″W
- Translator(s): W35EC-D Lake City

Links
- Public license information: Public file; LMS
- Website: www.wcjb.com

WCJB-TV (channel 20) is a television station in Gainesville, Florida, United States, affiliated with ABC and The CW Plus. Owned by Gray Media alongside Telemundo affiliate WTGB-LD (channel 34), the station maintains studios on Northwest 43rd Street in Gainesville, and its transmitter is located near Micanopy, Florida.

== History ==
WCJB began broadcasting April 7, 1971, as an NBC affiliate owned by William E. "Bill" Minshall. Originally broadcasting on UHF channel 20, its call sign bears the first initials of his family members: Casey (daughter), JoAnn (wife), and himself, Bill. In 1973, just two years after its first broadcast, the station switched its affiliation to ABC. In 1976, WCJB was sold to Diversified Communications. In 2001, it began airing its digital signal on UHF channel 16. WCJB was one of the ABC affiliates that aired Saving Private Ryan in 2004.

On September 18, 2006, WCJB launched a new second digital subchannel to be the area's CW affiliate as part of the national CW Plus service, replacing the cable-only WB 100+ affiliate "WBFL" after the WB–UPN merger.

Its coverage area includes Lake City (within the Jacksonville market), Ocala (in the Orlando market) and most of North Central Florida. It is also the sole ABC affiliate on cable systems in Live Oak and Jasper (both within the Tallahassee market). Until July 2006, WCJB was the only ABC affiliate seen on Cox Cable systems in Ocala. Even though that city is part of the Orlando market, this station had exclusivity on that system for ABC programming. This kept in-market affiliate WFTV off the system for several years. In that month, the cable company received the green light to pick up WFTV's standard and high definition feeds in Ocala. WFTV and WCJB are also both seen on Charter Spectrum in Belleview and unincorporated Marion County.

Diversified announced on February 16, 2017, that it would exit broadcasting and sell WCJB and its sister station WABI-TV in Bangor, Maine, to Gray Television for $85 million. The sale was completed on May 1, 2017. It made WCJB a sister station to WCTV (Gray Television's then-flagship station) in Tallahassee and WJHG-TV and WECP-LD in Panama City.

The Florida Department of Health sent a cease and desist letter to the station, alongside a few others such as Tampa's WFLA-TV, dated October 3, 2024, over a broadcast of a political advertisement backing Amendment 4, relating to the abortion laws in the state. The move was criticized by the Federal Communications Commission.

== Programming ==
=== Sports programming ===
WCJB airs select Florida Gators football games as part of ABC's rights to college football telecasts, including select SEC contests beginning in 2024 under the SEC on ABC branding. The station aired the Gators' first-ever national championship in 1996 through their victory in the 1997 Sugar Bowl.

=== News operation ===
WCJB presently broadcasts 39 hours, 15 minutes of locally produced newscasts each week (with 6 hours, 35 minutes each weekday and three hours each on Saturdays and Sundays). The station also broadcasts 2 1/2 hours of late local news each week on its CW subchannel.

Originally, WCJB was the only station to operate a news department covering the Gainesville area. As a result, it held the number one spot in Nielsen ratings by a wide margin for most of the station's existence. In addition to its main studios, this station operates a Marion County Bureau on Northeast 1st Avenue in Ocala.

Until the establishment of rival WGFL's GTN News in 2010 (later CBS 4 News), WCJB had the only local news department on a commercial station—non-commercial station WUFT airs a nightly newscast produced by University of Florida journalism and broadcasting students; and Fox affiliate WOGX simulcasts newscasts from sister station WOFL in Orlando, with no separate local inserts targeted to the Gainesville area. Following the discontinuation of CBS 4 News on May 12, 2023, WCJB reassumed its position as the only commercial news station serving Gainesville.

From September 18, 2006, until February 2010, it produced a half-hour weeknight prime time newscast on WCJB-DT2, titled WCJB-TV 20 News at 10 on Gainesville CW. The live broadcast was dropped in favor of a repeat of the main channel's 6 p.m. show, but the repeat was later dropped as well.

On January 18, 2016, WCJB expanded its early evening newscast to an hour at 5 p.m. The 6 p.m. newscast remained as scheduled.

On September 6, 2021, WCJB added an hour-long weekday 4 p.m. newscast on the main channel and relaunched a half-hour 10 p.m. newscast on the DT2 CW subchannel.

On September 5, 2022, WCJB extended its weekday noon newscast to one hour, with the last half-hour replacing the canceled Right This Minute.

On January 24, 2026, WCJB added a two-hour weekend morning newscast beginning at 6 a.m.

==== Florida–Dayton recreation ====
On March 29, 2014, the Florida Gators beat the Dayton Flyers 62–52 in the Elite Eight of the NCAA basketball tournament. Since WCJB is an ABC affiliate and CBS owned the broadcast rights (although the game aired nationally on TBS), the network could not show highlights until the day after per NCAA regulations. The news team instead recreated the highlights inside a conference room at the station's studio, using a mini-hoop attached to the wall and the station staff doubling as players.

== Technical information ==
=== Subchannels ===
The station's signal is multiplexed:

Subchannels of WCJB-TV
Subchannel	Res.	Short name	Programming
20.1	720p	WCJB-TV	ABC
20.2	720p	WCJB-CW	The CW Plus
20.3	480i	MeTV	MeTV
20.4	480i	365BLK	365BLK
20.5	480i	TruTV	True Crime Network
20.6	480i	Grit-TV	Grit

WCJB-DT2 upgraded its signal to 720p in June 2012.

In January 2018, WCJB added MeTV to its subchannel lineup on channel 20.3, marking the first new subchannel added to WCJB since adding Gainesville CW in September 2006. MeTV had been aired on WNBW's subchannel 9.4 prior to the change.

On January 1, 2020, WCJB launched a new subchannel, Circle, on channel 20.4.

In March 2020, WCJB added another new subchannel, Justice Network (now True Crime Network), on channel 20.5.

On December 1, 2022, the station added a sixth subchannel, Grit.

=== Analog-to-digital conversion ===
WCJB-TV ended regular programming on its analog signal, over UHF channel 20, on February 17, 2009, the original target date on which full-power television stations in the United States were to transition from analog to digital broadcasts under federal mandate (which was later pushed back to June 12, 2009). The station's digital signal remained on its pre-transition UHF channel 16, using virtual channel 20.

=== Former translator ===
Until 1998, WCJB operated an analog translator station, W57AN (channel 57) which rebroadcast WCJB's signal into Marion County from a transmitter located on NE Jacksonville Road in Ocala.

== See also ==
- Channel 16 digital TV stations in the United States
- Channel 20 virtual TV stations in the United States
