= WWDT-CD =

Television station in Naples, Florida

Semi-satellite of WSCV, Fort Lauderdale–Miami, Florida
- Naples–Fort Myers, Florida; United States
- City: Naples, Florida
- Channels: Digital: 30 (UHF); Virtual: 43
- Branding: Telemundo Fort Myers–Naples; Noticiero Telemundo 51 (during newscast simulcasts)

Programming
- Affiliations: 43.1: Telemundo; for others, see § Subchannels

Ownership
- Owner: Telemundo Station Group; (NBC Telemundo License LLC)

History
- First air date: June 4, 1990
- Former call signs: W43AY (1990–1998); WWDT-LP (1998–2001); WWDT-CA (2001–2011)

Technical information
- Licensing authority: FCC
- Facility ID: 58261
- Class: CD
- ERP: 11.6 kW
- HAAT: 122.2 m (401 ft)
- Transmitter coordinates: 26°30′19.6″N 81°51′7.7″W
- Translator(s): WBBH-TV 43.10 Fort Myers

Links
- Public license information: Public file; LMS
- Website: Fort Myers and Naples section on WSCV website

WWDT-CD (channel 43) is a low-power, Class A television station licensed Naples, Florida, United States, serving as the Fort Myers area's outlet for the Spanish-language network Telemundo. The station is owned by the Telemundo Station Group subsidiary of NBCUniversal. WWDT-CD's studios are located on South Tamiami Trail in Bonita Springs, and its transmitter is located between Old 41 Road and Michael G. Rippe Parkway south of Fort Myers.

== Sale to NBCUniversal ==
On December 4, 2017, NBCUniversal's Telemundo Station Group announced its purchase of ZGS Communications' 13 television stations, including WWDT-CD. The sale was completed on February 1, 2018.

== Subchannels ==
The station's signal is multiplexed:

Subchannels of WWDT-CD
Subchannel	Res.	Short name	Programming
43.1	1080i	WWDT-CD	Telemundo
43.2	480i	Xitos	TeleXitos
43.3	480i	CRIMES	NBC True CRMZ
43.4	480i	Oxygen	Oxygen
