= WBBH-TV =

Television station in Fort Myers, Florida

- Fort Myers–Naples, Florida; United States
- City: Fort Myers, Florida
- Channels: Digital: 15 (UHF); Virtual: 20
- Branding: Gulf Coast NBC

Programming
- Affiliations: 20.1: NBC; for others, see § Subchannels

Ownership
- Owner: Hearst Television; (Fort Myers-Naples HTV LLC)
- Sister stations: WZVN-TV

History
- First air date: December 18, 1968
- Former channel numbers: Analog: 20 (UHF, 1968–2009)
- Former affiliations: ABC (secondary, 1968–1974)
- Call sign meaning: Buerry, Burgess, and Hoffman, original investors in the station

Technical information
- Licensing authority: FCC
- Facility ID: 71085
- ERP: 1,000 kW
- HAAT: 454.5 m (1,491 ft)
- Transmitter coordinates: 26°49′22.4″N 81°45′53.6″W

Links
- Public license information: Public file; LMS
- Website: www.gulfcoastnewsnow.com

WBBH-TV (channel 20, cable channel 2), branded as Gulf Coast NBC, is a television station licensed to Fort Myers, Florida, United States, serving as the NBC affiliate for Southwest Florida. It is owned by Hearst Television and operated alongside Naples-licensed ABC affiliate WZVN-TV (channel 26). The two stations share studio facilities on Central Avenue in Fort Myers; WBBH-TV's transmitter is located along SR 31 in unincorporated southeastern Charlotte County.

WBBH-TV went on the air in December 1968 as the second station in Fort Myers; it has been an NBC affiliate since its first day on air. Waterman Broadcasting owned WBBH from 1979 to 2023; WBBH took over most of the operations of what is now WZVN-TV in 1994. The two stations have separate newscasts with separate anchors, though they share reporters, news resources, and—as of 2025—a common news brand.

== History ==
=== Buerry, Burgess, and Hoffman: Early years ===
In 1967, two companies petitioned the Federal Communications Commission (FCC) to add channels in the ultra high frequency (UHF) band to the table of usable TV channels in Fort Myers, Florida. Acting on the proposals from Kenneth Schwartz and Hubbard Broadcasting, the FCC allotted channel 20 in January 1968. That May, Broadcasting-Telecasting Services, Inc., headed by former WMYR sales director and announcer Joseph Buerry Jr., applied for channel 20, proposing a station with an intensive focus on local programming, and an emphasis on local news. No other group applied, and Broadcasting-Telecasting Services received a construction permit in July. It announced its intention to be a primary NBC affiliate with a secondary ABC affiliation. Buerry, along with investors Jackson Burgess and Howard Hoffman (also formerly of WMYR), gave the station its call letters—WBBH-TV.

The studios were finished by the start of December, with erection of the station's transmitting tower in Lehigh Acres still ongoing. The station began broadcasting on December 18, 1968. Previously, Miami's WCKT had imported NBC programming into Fort Myers by way of a translator on channel 70; Tampa's WFLA-TV had been carried alongside WCKT on most area cable systems.

After nearly six years, Buerry resigned as president in August 1974; he had been visible on air presenting station editorials. (Note: Buerry was then hired as WEVU's general manager in 1976, remaining there until 1980.) Hoffman became the general manager at a time when the station was suffering financially, though it had begun to turn a profit in 1972. The station lost ABC programs to a new station in Naples, WEVU (channel 26), at this time as well.

=== Waterman ownership ===
In 1978, Waterman Broadcasting Corporation, which at the time only owned two radio stations in San Antonio, Texas, began negotiating to buy WBBH-TV after the stockholders of Broadcasting-Telecasting Services opted to put the station on the market. A sale agreement was reached in April 1979. Waterman activated a new tower in 1983; the station began broadcasting at the UHF maximum effective radiated power of five million watts and improved its signal in the northern part of its coverage area. In 1987, an expansion was completed to the Central Avenue studio; the original, 7,000-square-foot (650 m^{2}) building was wrapped around a two-story building with an internal atrium.

Waterman Broadcasting attempted to expand the station's presence in the early 1990s. It first thought it had an agreement with WNPL-TV (channel 46) to program that station under a time brokerage agreement. However, WNPL was in turmoil at the time. The agreement was reached during a period in which the station manager left; he then came back and ignored the agreement, with station officials calling the issue a misunderstanding. Waterman then sued WNPL, which in turn filed for bankruptcy protection.

On June 1, 1994, Ellis Communications, the owner of WEVU, entered into a local marketing agreement (LMA) with WBBH-TV, which began providing the station's news programming. Some WEVU staffers were not retained by WBBH; in all, there were 20 staff firings, including WEVU's main news, weather and sports anchors. That September, WBBH began branding as channel 2 after its position on local cable systems; WEVU did likewise with channel 7 and changed its call sign to WZVN-TV the next year.

Ellis Communications merged with Raycom Media in 1996; under a deal previously made by Ellis, WZVN-TV's license was sold to Montclair Communications, which continued the LMA with WBBH. Montclair was founded by Lara Kunkler, station manager for WBBH and WZVN and the goddaughter of Bernie Waterman, owner of Waterman Broadcasting. The deal allowed a once-money-losing station to become profitable. In 2001, Waterman attempted to merge with Montclair by way of a stock swap. However, instead of allowing the deal, the FCC let the application languish; at one point, it ordered the LMA unwound by 2004.

=== Sale to Hearst ===
Logo of WBBH-TV in 2024

Waterman Broadcasting announced on April 5, 2023, that it would sell WBBH-TV to Hearst Television, the first sale of the station in 44 years. The $220 million deal marked the sale of the company's last media property after having been founded in 1956. Company executives cited Edith Waterman's desire to sell the station before her 100th birthday. The sale was completed on June 30; Hearst would also continue programming WZVN-TV on Montclair's behalf.

Hearst rebranded WBBH-TV and WZVN-TV as Gulf Coast NBC and Gulf Coast ABC, with newscasts known as Gulf Coast News, effective February 5, 2025.

== News operation ==
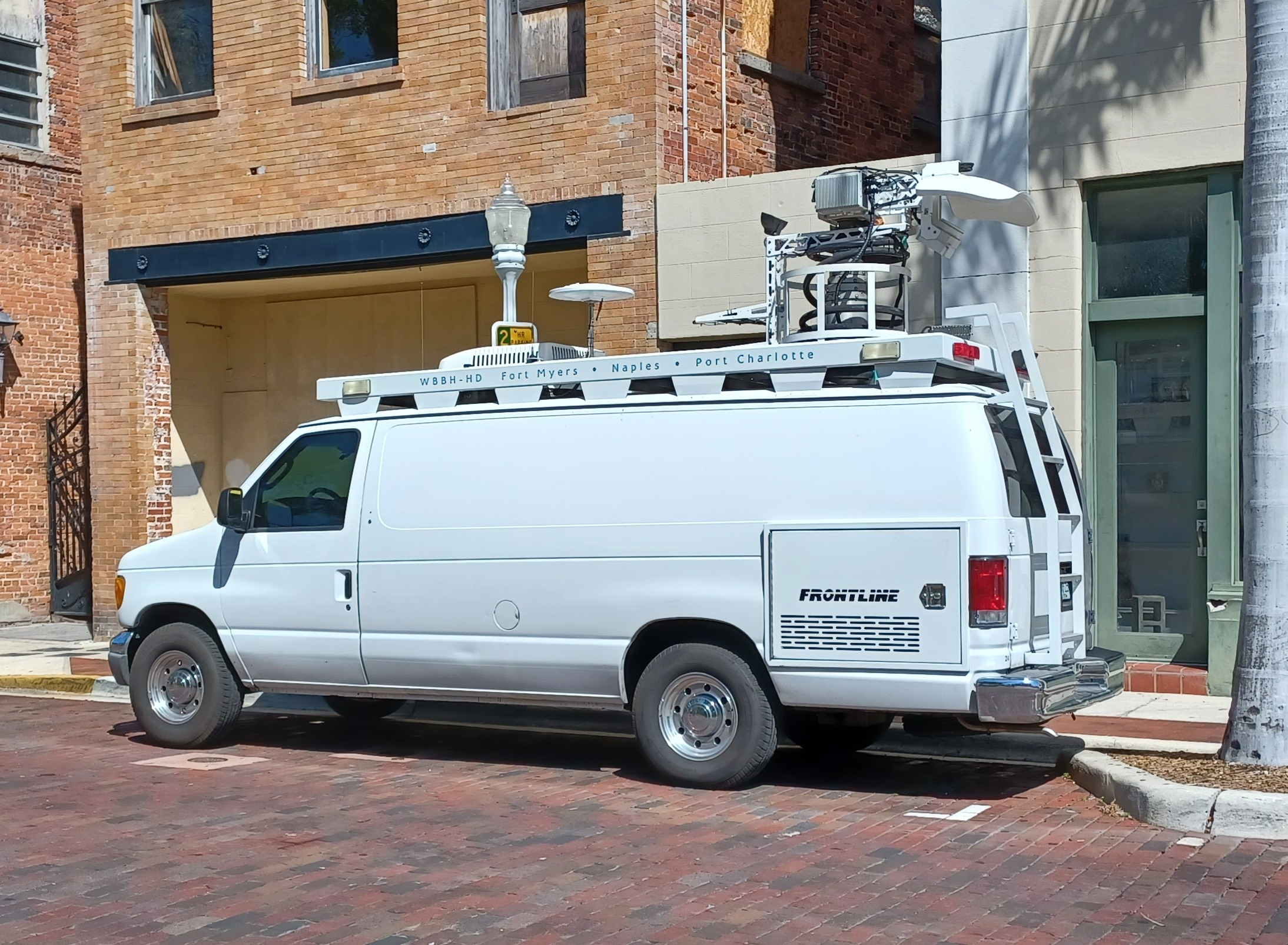
A WBBH news van in Fort Myers

WINK-TV (channel 11), which had been the only local station prior to channel 20 signing on the air, remained the news leader in the market until 1974, when WBBH rose to the top and provided serious competition for WINK. However, by the early 1980s, it had slipped behind WINK, though it was well ahead of WEVU, whose news ratings were typically anemic. Beginning in January 1994, WBBH experimented with producing newscasts for air on local cable systems' local origination channels: these included 7 p.m., 10 p.m., and midnight broadcasts branded as the Eyewitness News Network.

Logo of Gulf Coast News since February 5, 2025

In the wake of the WEVU LMA in 1994, equipment investments were made for the joint operation. WBBH–WZVN had the market's first Doppler weather radar installed in the mid-1990s, and in 1997, a studio expansion was completed allowing both stations to present simultaneous 11 p.m. newscasts. The stations have dedicated anchors but share reporters; during major hurricane coverage, the stations have often aired a single telecast using their combined news and weather resources. Despite the shared resources, news viewership has tilted strongly toward WBBH—which continues to compete with WINK for first—over WZVN.

In 2018, the Waterman stations cut back their sports department; weeknight sportscasts were eliminated, along with the position of sports director for WBBH-TV. That same year, WBBH added a 3 p.m. newscast, giving it three and a half straight hours of local news leading into the NBC Nightly News.

=== Notable former on-air staff ===
- Gene Lavanchy — sports anchor, 1986–1988
- John Muller – reporter
- Susan Rook — reporter, early 1980s
- Shepard Smith – reporter, late 1980s–1992
- Ukee Washington — sports anchor, 1981–1987

== Technical information ==
=== Subchannels ===
WBBH-TV's transmitter is located along SR 31 in unincorporated southeastern Charlotte County. The station's signal is multiplexed:

Subchannels of WBBH-TV
| Subchannel | Res. | Short name | Programming |
|---|---|---|---|
| 20.1 | 1080i | WBBH-HD | NBC |
| 20.2 | 480i | H&I | Heroes & Icons |
| 20.3 | 480i | ETV | Estrella TV |
| 20.4 | 480i | MeTOONS | MeTV Toons |
| 43.10 | 480i | WWDT | Telemundo (WWDT-CD) |

Simulcast of subchannels of another station

=== Analog-to-digital conversion ===
On October 31, 2002, WZVN-TV and WBBH-TV began broadcasting high-definition television, the first stations in the market to do so. The conversion to digital required the construction of a new tower, as the 1983-built mast did not meet more stringent wind loading requirements.

WBBH-TV ended regular programming on its analog signal, over UHF channel 20, on February 17, 2009, the original digital television transition date. As part of the SAFER Act, WBBH-TV kept its analog signal on the air until February 21 to inform viewers of the digital television transition through a loop of public service announcements from the National Association of Broadcasters. The station's digital signal remained on its pre-transition UHF channel 15, using virtual channel 20.

WBBH-TV broadcast WZVN-TV from its transmitter between October 2019 and March 2020 while repack work was conducted on that station's own transmitter equipment.

== See also ==
- Channel 2 branded TV stations in the United States
- Channel 15 digital TV stations in the United States
- Channel 20 virtual TV stations in the United States
