= WNBW-DT =

Television station in Gainesville, Florida

- Gainesville, Florida; United States
- Channels: Digital: 8 (VHF); Virtual: 9

Programming
- Affiliations: 9.1: Roar; for others, see § Subchannels

Ownership
- Owner: Sinclair Broadcast Group; (WGFL Licensee, LLC)
- Sister stations: WGFL, WYME-CD

History
- First air date: December 31, 2008
- Former channel numbers: Digital: 9 (VHF, 2008–2020)
- Former affiliations: NBC (2008–2025)
- Call sign meaning: NBC in Western Florida (former affiliation)

Technical information
- Licensing authority: FCC
- Facility ID: 83965
- ERP: 65 kW
- HAAT: 260 m (853 ft)
- Transmitter coordinates: 29°37′47.7″N 82°34′24″W

Links
- Public license information: Public file; LMS

WNBW-DT (channel 9) is a television station in Gainesville, Florida, United States, airing programming from the digital multicast network Roar. It is owned by Sinclair Broadcast Group alongside CBS/MyNetworkTV/NBC affiliate WGFL (channel 28) and low-power, Class A Antenna TV affiliate WYME-CD (channel 45). The three stations share studios on Northwest 80th Boulevard (along I-75/SR 93) in Gainesville and transmitter facilities on Southwest 30th Avenue near Newberry.

WNBW-DT began broadcasting on the final day of 2008 and was the first in-market NBC affiliate serving Gainesville since 1973, with NBC affiliates from Orlando and Jacksonville carried on cable serving as the primary source of the network's programming for the city. MPS Media, a virtual duopoly partner of New Age Media, owned the station and contracted with New Age to operate it. In 2014, Sinclair began providing many operational services for the New Age stations in lieu of an attempted purchase of most of the company.

== History ==
In June 2008, WGFL announced that it would be launching a new digital-only television station on September 8, utilizing a construction permit that had been filed for in 1996 as analog channel 29 and approved in 2005. Construction required the early termination of analog service from WGFL on July 28.

New Age Media officially launched WNBW-DT on December 31, 2008, at 11:30 p.m. through an LMA with MPS Media, New Age's typical partner in such projects, which purchased the permit from its original owner, Pegasus Communications. On that date, WNBW began regular programming, bringing local NBC service back to Gainesville since WCJB-TV switched its affiliation from the network to ABC in 1973. Cable homes in the station's service area had been served by WESH from Orlando and WTLV from Jacksonville; MPS estimated 32,000 homes in Gainesville went unserved by the network prior to launching WNBW. It holds rights to enforce blackouts on out-of-market stations carrying NBC and syndicated programming such as WESH in Orlando, which originally served Gainesville and Ocala as the de facto affiliate. Cox Communications began offering WNBW to Gainesville-area cable subscribers on channel 9 beginning January 16, 2009, and it began blacking out WESH during network programming that July. Originally, WNBW indicated it would eventually air some local programming including local newscasts by the end of 2009, a requirement of its affiliation agreement.

On September 25, 2013, New Age Media announced that it would sell most of its stations, including WGFL and WMYG-LP, to the Sinclair Broadcast Group. Concurrently, MPS Media planned to sell WNBW-DT to Cunningham Broadcasting; the station would have continued to be operated by WGFL. On October 31, 2014, MPS Media requested the dismissal of its application to sell WNBW-DT; the next day, Sinclair purchased the non-license assets of the stations it planned to buy from New Age Media and began operating them through a master service agreement.

On July 28, 2021, the FCC issued a forfeiture order stemming from a lawsuit against MPS Media. The lawsuit, filed by AT&T, alleged that MPS Media failed to negotiate for retransmission consent in good faith for the stations. Owners of other Sinclair-managed stations, such as Deerfield Media, were also named in the lawsuit. MPS was ordered to pay a fine of $512,288.

On December 10, 2025, the NBC affiliation was moved to WGFL's third subchannel, while WNBW's main channel flipped to Roar.

On February 17, 2026, Sinclair announced that it would acquire WNBW from MPS Media, creating a legal duopoly with WGFL. The sale was completed on April 17.

== Newscasts ==
WGFL and WNBW simulcast CBS 4 News, which produced 6 and 11 p.m. newscasts for the Gainesville area and cut-ins during the stations' respective national morning shows. The news service was known as GTN News until 2016 and produced by Independent News Network in Davenport, Iowa. The newscasts were produced at Sinclair's WPEC in West Palm Beach.

On May 12, 2023, the stations aired one final newscast, as Sinclair discontinued the local news operation. Both stations now run editions of Sinclair's nationally syndicated newscast The National News Desk in place of locally-produced newscasts until WNBW and WGFL's third subchannel swapped affiliations on December 10, 2025.

== Technical information ==
=== Subchannels ===
The station's signal is multiplexed:

Subchannels of WNBW-DT
Channel	Res.	Short name	Programming
9.1	1080i	ROAR	Roar
9.2	480i	Charge!	Charge!
9.3	480i	Comet	Comet (4:3)
9.4	480i	Antenna	Antenna TV (WYME-CD)
9.5	480i	TheNest	The Nest

Simulcast of subchannels of another station

Until June 3, 2015, WYME-CD did not air a digital signal, as with the case of many Class A stations. WYME-CD is also broadcast as WNBW's fourth subchannel.

As part of the repacking process following the 2016–2017 FCC incentive auction, WNBW shifted from transmitting on channel 9 to channel 8 on May 1, 2020.

== See also ==
- Channel 8 digital TV stations in the United States
- Channel 9 virtual TV stations in the United States
