= KIXE-TV =

Television station in Redding, California

- Redding–Chico, California; United States
- City: Redding, California
- Channels: Digital: 9 (VHF); Virtual: 9
- Branding: KIXE PBS

Programming
- Affiliations: 9.1: PBS; for others, see § Subchannels

Ownership
- Owner: Northern California Educational Television Association, Inc.

History
- First air date: October 5, 1964
- Former channel numbers: Analog: 9 (VHF, 1964–2008); Digital: 18 (UHF, 2004–2008)
- Former affiliations: NET (1964–1970)
- Call sign meaning: IX (Roman numeral 9) and Education

Technical information
- Licensing authority: FCC
- Facility ID: 47285
- ERP: 15 kW
- HAAT: 1,091 m (3,579 ft)
- Transmitter coordinates: 40°36′8.5″N 122°39′5″W
- Translator(s): see § Translators

Links
- Public license information: Public file; LMS
- Website: www.kixe.org

KIXE-TV (channel 9) is a PBS member television station in Redding, California, United States, serving the northern Sacramento Valley. The station is owned by the Northern California Educational Television Association. KIXE's studios are located on North Market Street (SR 299) on the north side of Redding, and its transmitter is located atop Shasta Bally.

Educational broadcasting came to the Redding and Chico area in 1964 with the launch of KIXE-TV, which culminated an 11-year effort by local educators. The station was built in spite of competition for channel 9 from a proposed third commercial station for the region. Originally housed on the campus of Chico State College (now Chico State University), KIXE initially had no local programming capability and served to rebroadcast programs from KVIE in Sacramento. It moved its studios to Redding in 1967. In the 1970s, the station explored and initially approved a return to Chico, which led to infighting among the board of directors and was eventually reversed by members who favored keeping the station in Redding. The present studios on Market Street were completed in 1986, during a boom period in support that ended with declining revenues in the early 1990s.

The station's finances steadied in the 1990s, though drops in federal support still required cutbacks in broadcasting. KIXE transitioned to exclusively digital broadcasting in 2008 and, in response to interference concerns, installed a new translator to serve Chico in 2009; its payroll declined by half as a result of the Great Recession, and in 2013 it struggled to raise necessary funds from its small service area.

== History ==
=== Foundation and early years ===
The Northern California Educational Television Association was formed in March 1953 to prepare an application for educational television in the far north of the state, including Butte, Plumas, Shasta, Siskiyou, Tehama, and Trinity counties. The association was largely inactive until 1961, after the Federal Communications Commission (FCC) moved to assign channel 9 to Redding for commercial use. With the backing of the commercial stations in Redding and Chico (KVIP-TV and KHSL-TV), it began the process of compiling an application to use it as an educational station.

Commercial interests also sought the new channel 9. The Redding-Chico Television Company was formed in April 1961 to apply for the new station, It contended that a previous attempt by KVIP-TV and KHSL-TV's owners to move channel 9 to Susanville amounted to a bid to block further competition and claimed a fourth VHF channel could also be assigned, though the educators believed that channel 11 could only cover Redding. In the meantime, the Northern California Educational Television Association formally applied for channel 9 on June 21, 1961.

The FCC rejected the channel 11 proposal in November 1961, but channel 9 remained unadjudicated. When the association threatened to drop the case because it lacked money to pay lawyers in Washington, KVIP and KHSL contributed the funds, a move met with disdain by the Redding-Chico Television group. The case reached comparative hearing at the FCC in January 1963, but shortly after, stockholders in Redding-Chico formed Sacramento Valley Television and moved to buy KVIP-TV, dropping their channel 9 application in the process.

On October 10, 1963, an FCC hearing examiner granted the construction permit, finding that the association had made an adequate showing of their financial resources. The group struggled with fundraising issues and deadlines that were tighter owing to the commercial classification of the channel. The station was assigned the call sign KIXE-TV, consisting of the Roman numeral IX (nine) and an E for education. To get the station on the air, the association opted to cut back most of its plans for the first year and operate the new station as a satellite station of KVIE, the public television station in Sacramento, with no local programming. Later, a deal was reached with Chico State College to house a temporary studio and limited local programming facilities.

With the broadcast of the in-school children's program Let's Figure, KIXE-TV began on October 5, 1964. Using a transmitter borrowed from channel 7 (now KRCR-TV), it provided educational television to nearly 20,000 students in 22 districts in four counties.

In its first year, KIXE-TV only operated during the day, and it went off the air entirely when school let out for the summer. In March 1965, it made a special evening telecast of a state senatorial debate, Its next evening broadcast was a televised auction, partially simulcast by KRCR-TV and KHSL-TV and produced by the latter station, to raise funds. After the auction, the station began airing regular evening programming. With no video tape facilities of its own, all programming had to be produced live until the station was able to purchase units being discarded by KCET in Los Angeles. Bill Reed, the station's first general manager, hosted an interview program that he later canceled on account of its poor quality.

The station moved from Chico State to facilities in Redding in 1967, first at 1304 East Street and then to a converted meat locker at 825 Industrial Street after a second move in 1972. This gave the station its own studio for the first time. In 1971, the station obtained a new transmitter, enabling it to broadcast in color.

=== Attempted relocation to Chico ===
The 1972 studio on Industrial Street utilized black-and-white production equipment on permanent loan from Shasta College in Redding, which in turn received use of the studio for its academic courses. By 1974, the station was considering moving to the Shasta College campus, enabling it to utilize the resources of its telecommunications program while maintaining autonomy. The college's board of trustees approved a deal in January 1975, but the move was called off after the California state government cut funding to community colleges.

As a result, KIXE-TV began talking with Chico State University about relocation. Chico State had just opened a new, color-capable television studio in the new Learning Activities Resource Center, and the two institutions had an ongoing relationship dating back to channel 9's launch. While the facility would be available to KIXE rent-free and provide synergies with Chico State's academic programs and cost savings and improved access to Corporation for Public Broadcasting grants, the station would have to relocate most of its operation from Redding to Chico. Concerns were raised about the potential loss of autonomy of KIXE-TV vis-a-vis Chico State over time and the loss of a cultural resource in Redding. The latter was echoed by civic leaders in Redding, including the city council, and by volunteers who feared the loss of equity built up from years in Redding.

The nine-member board of directors of the Northern California Educational Television Association approved the move to Chico on November 16, 1976, on a 5–1 vote. When three vacancies came up on the board, opponents of the move were successful in electing their slate of candidates, and an additional vacancy was filled by the appointment of a Redding woman. As a result, move opponents held a 5–4 majority and voted by that margin to reverse the move decision in September 1977. The three pro-Chico directors walked out after the vote and generally refused to open the issue.

=== New studios in Redding and fundraising challenges ===
In the early 1980s, KIXE-TV management began to analyze the expansion or relocation of the station's studios in Redding. This activity came to fruition after Victor Hogstrom left a cable-only public TV station in Rockford, Illinois, to direct channel 9 in 1983. KIXE acquired a building on North Market Street (State Route 273) in Redding in April 1985. That November, work began to convert the building into new studios for KIXE-TV, larger than the former meat locker on Industrial. The facility was completed in December 1986 thanks to a mix of viewer donations and federal equipment grants, with naming rights having been sold to rooms including the lunch room and broom closet.

During the Hogstrom years, KIXE-TV emerged as one of the best-supported public TV stations in the nation by its small audience, with the highest per-capita viewership in California and seventh in the U.S. Membership more than doubled from 7,000 to 15,000 in 1991, when Hogstrom departed to run WTCI in Chattanooga, Tennessee. It grew to 26 full-time staff and a local programming output of 25 hours a year, including specials such as the Red Bluff Roundup and Shasta Dixieland Jazz Festival. However, the final year of Hogstrom's management proved challenging. After his departure for Chattanooga, it was revealed that he had concealed information about KIXE-TV's finances from its board and had tussled with the board president. An independent audit completed in February 1991, a month after Hogstrom left, warned that the station's poor cash flow and high expenses threatened to send it into "liquidation status" within months. Station employees said they were afraid to tell Hogstrom about financial issues because they feared retribution, with one calling him an "intimidating man". Under interim management, the station laid off 35 percent of its staff and scaled back its local programming in response to the loss it recorded in 1990.

Under the next general manager, Lyle Mettler, KIXE-TV struggled to raise funds and ran deficits in the 1991–92, 1992–93, and 1993–94 fiscal years as income declined by 9 percent, though the station raised funds to buy a new transmitter during the period. The station also experimented with an early prime time schedule for its PBS programming at a time when commercial stations in Northern California were interested in the concept. Mettler's tenure was additionally marred by sex discrimination charges; the station was sued after a woman was forced out following efforts to bring discrimination to the board's attention.

=== The Myron Tisdel years ===
Myron Tisdel, previously KIXE-TV's program manager, was named acting general manager and later general manager following Mettler's departure. The transmitter and tower project was completed in late 1995, allowing the station to broadcast stereo sound. In spite of improvements, the station cut back its broadcasting hours slightly in 1997 to cope with a decline in federal grants and a 23-percent utility rate increase.

Another challenge the station faced under Tisdel was the national transition to digital television broadcasting. By 2004, KIXE had a low-power digital signal on the air, covering Redding; that year, it received a federal grant to build a high-power digital transmitter and convert translators in outlying areas. On August 22, 2008, KIXE made an early digital switchover and shut off its analog signal to avoid likely winter weather conditions on Shasta Bally in February 2009, when the shut-off was set to take place. When KVIE switched to digital in June 2009, its post-transition digital signal was also on channel 9, generating co-channel interference in southern parts of the KIXE service area, including Marysville, Oroville, and Paradise. To remedy the issue, KIXE activated a translator on Cohasset Ridge later that year at a site used by KHSL-TV.

=== KIXE in the 2010s and 2020s ===
Tisdel retired in late 2009. KIXE went through several leaders. Philip Smith—whose tenure was most known for the controversial withdrawal of Democracy Now! from the station's schedule—resigned after a year, being replaced by 33-year station employee Mike Lampella. During this time, the station had cut its payroll by half of what it had been in the early 2000s in the wake of the Great Recession.

In 2013, the station explored collaborations with KEET in Eureka. Both stations at the time had failed to raise the minimum nonfederal financial support necessary for Corporation for Public Broadcasting grants, with KIXE-TV experiencing its first shortfall since signing on in 1964 but KEET routinely receiving waivers. KIXE barely raised the necessary $800,000, largely ascribed to in-kind donations.

Dave Cox, a former board member, was named general manager in 2019 (though he had been serving as a fill-in since 2017) and served until 2024, when he was replaced by Robert Keenan, who had been at KIXE since 1990.

== Funding ==
In the year ended June 30, 2023, the Northern California Educational Television Association had more than $1.98 million in revenue. Community Service Grants from the Corporation for Public Broadcasting constituted $833,000, or 40 percent, of the total.

== Technical information ==
=== Subchannels ===
The station's signal is multiplexed:

Subchannels of KIXE-TV
Subchannel	Res.	Short name	Programming
9.1	720p	KIXE-DT	PBS
9.2	480i	CREATE	Create
9.3	480i	WLD/FNX	World (7 p.m.–9 a.m.); First Nations Experience (9 a.m.–7 p.m.)

== Translators ==
KIXE-TV's signal is additionally rebroadcast over the following translators:

- Alturas, Likely: K20DE-D
- Chico and Paradise: K18ND-D
- Etna: K03HX-D
- Fall River Mills: K28DB-D
- Hayfork: K05CR-D
- Lakehead: K14HX-D
- Lewiston: K28CY-D
- Newell: K08OB-D
- Weaverville: K02EE-D
- Yreka: K19GL-D
