= WGFL =

Television station in High Springs, Florida

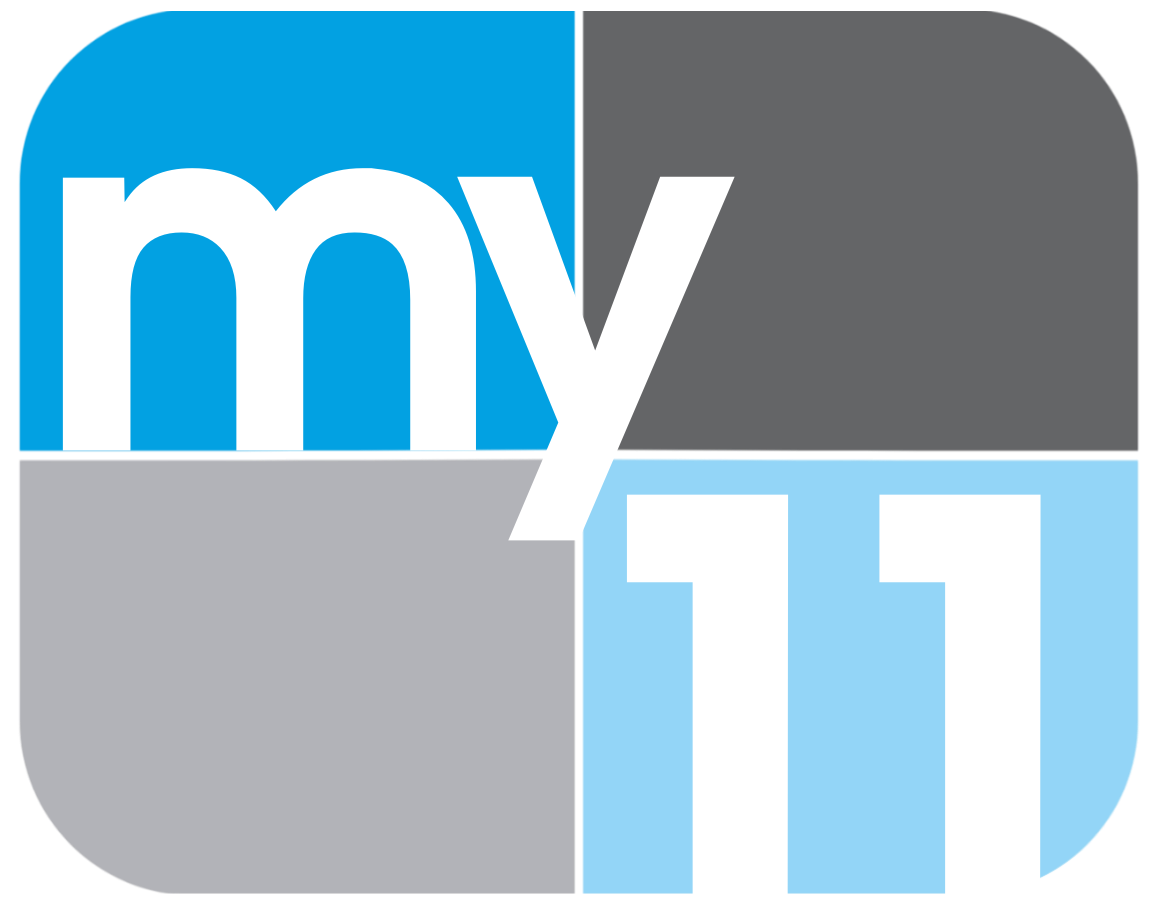
- High Springs–Gainesville, Florida; United States
- City: High Springs, Florida
- Channels: Digital: 29 (UHF); Virtual: 28
- Branding: CBS 4 (cable channel); My 11 Gainesville (28.2); NBC 9 (28.3)

Programming
- Affiliations: 28.1: CBS; 28.2: Independent with MyNetworkTV; 28.3: NBC

Ownership
- Owner: Sinclair Broadcast Group; (WGFL Licensee, LLC)
- Sister stations: WNBW-DT, WYME-CD

History
- Founded: June 22, 1987
- First air date: September 20, 1997
- Former call signs: WHSF (1987–1989)
- Former channel numbers: Analog: 53 (UHF, 1997–2008); Digital: 28 (UHF, until 2020)
- Former affiliations: The WB (1997–2002); UPN (secondary, 1997–2004)
- Call sign meaning: Gainesville, Florida

Technical information
- Licensing authority: FCC
- Facility ID: 7727
- ERP: 300 kW
- HAAT: 288 m (945 ft)
- Transmitter coordinates: 29°37′47.7″N 82°34′24″W

Links
- Public license information: Public file; LMS
- Website: mycbs4.com

WGFL (channel 28, cable channel 4) is a television station licensed to High Springs, Florida, United States, serving the Gainesville area as an affiliate of CBS, MyNetworkTV and NBC. It is owned by Sinclair Broadcast Group alongside Roar affiliate WNBW-DT (channel 9), and low-power, Class A Antenna TV affiliate WYME-CD (channel 45). The three stations share studios on Northwest 80th Boulevard (along I-75/SR 93) in Gainesville and transmitter facilities on Southwest 30th Avenue near Newberry.

WGFL was also used to provide full-market over-the-air high definition digital coverage of co-owned low-power analog MyNetworkTV affiliate WMYG-LP (simulcast over WGFL-DT2). This ended when the low-power station's license was canceled on November 18, 2015; it now operates solely as a subchannel of WGFL.

The Gainesville market is located between several other Florida TV markets. In these areas, local cable systems opt instead for the affiliate for their home market instead of WGFL. This includes Charter Spectrum and Cox in Ocala (part of the Orlando market) that both offer WKMG-TV and WESH. In Lake City (part of the Jacksonville market), Comcast Xfinity provides WJAX-TV and WTLV.

== History ==
=== As a WB affiliate ===
WGFL signed on September 20, 1997, offering an analog signal on UHF channel 53. It originally served as the WB affiliate for the Gainesville area and was known on-air as "WB 53". The station also maintained a secondary affiliation with UPN, carrying its programming at 10 p.m. following WB's regular prime time schedule.

WGFL's daytime programming mainly consisted of classic sitcom reruns along with various reality/talk shows such as Queen Latifah. Like most WB affiliates at the time, WGFL carried the afternoon Kids' WB line up along with more youth oriented sitcoms like Sister, Sister during the evenings.

=== Joining CBS ===
In May 2002, WGFL announced its intention to affiliate with the CBS network on July 15, 2002; this came about as an affiliation switch arose involving then-CBS affiliate WJXT and then-UPN affiliate WTEV (now WJAX-TV) in Jacksonville, which led WJXT to drop CBS programming and become an independent. Up until that point, WJXT had served as the default CBS affiliate for Gainesville because its signal offered city-grade coverage into the area.

When the switch took place, WGFL gained the CBS affiliation and the station re-branded to "CBS 4" (preferring to go by its cable channel number on Cox systems). Now displaced, the UPN programs were moved to late night hours on WGFL while The WB moved over to a new cable-only station branded as "WB 10" (again referring to the Cox channel assignment). The UPN programming would later move from WGFL in 2004 (see § Former translators).

The CBS affiliation also brought Florida Gators football as well as the NFL to the station through the network's rights to air SEC (until 2023) and AFC football games. The SEC games have been high ratings draws especially during the Gators' national championship seasons of 2006 and 2008. WGFL's primary channel also aired the Florida Gators men's basketball team's victories in the 2006 and 2007 NCAA national championship games as part of College Basketball on CBS Sports coverage and in the 2025 NCAA national championship game as part of NCAA March Madness coverage.

During the mid 2000s, WGFL went through a couple of ownership changes. In 2004, the station was sold to Pegasus Communications due an earlier time brokerage agreement with then-owner Budd Broadcasting A short time later, WGFL would become part of New Age Media after Pegasus filed for bankruptcy in 2005.

On September 25, 2013, New Age Media announced that it would sell most of its stations, including WGFL and WMYG-LP, to the Sinclair Broadcast Group. Concurrently, sister station WNBW-DT was slated to be sold to Cunningham Broadcasting and was to continue to be operated by WGFL. On October 31, 2014, New Age Media requested the dismissal of its application to sell WGFL; the next day, Sinclair purchased the non-license assets of the stations it planned to buy from New Age Media and began operating them through a master service agreement.

After WGFL's acquisition by Sinclair, the station retired its 12-year-old "CBS 4" logo in April 2016 and replaced it with a simplified logo identical to sister station KDBC-TV in El Paso, Texas.

=== Joining NBC ===
On December 10, 2025, the NBC affiliation was moved from WNBW to WGFL's third subchannel, while WNBW's main channel flipped to Roar.

On May 28, 2025, Sinclair announced that it would acquire WGFL and WYME outright. The sale was completed on August 1.

== Programming ==
In 2002, WGFL aired a weekly sports-oriented show on Friday evenings called Sports Showdown. The show mainly focused on the Gator sports teams and was originally hosted by Larry Vettel with former Gainesville Sun sports columnist Pat Dooley.

=== News operation ===
When the station became a CBS affiliate in 2002, there were plans to start a local news operation as early as the fall of that year. In 2003, WGFL reached an agreement to simulcast the noon, 6 p.m., and 11 p.m. newscasts from fellow CBS affiliate WTEV in Jacksonville, beginning that November. While WTEV's newscasts focused on the Jacksonville area, they did cover Gainesville during Gator football season or major news events. After a few years, WGFL quietly dropped the WTEV simulcasts in the fall of 2006 and replaced it with the nationally syndicated INN News, produced by Independent News Network.

On October 27, 2010, WGFL launched a local newscast produced by INN under the branding GTN News (standing for "Gainesville Television Network"). The newscast was produced from INN's studios (initially in Davenport, Iowa, but later Little Rock, Arkansas) using centralized anchors, and footage from local reporters. WGFL simulcast with WNBW at 6 and 11 p.m.; the 11 p.m. newscast can be delayed on either station due to network obligations. WGFL and WNBW also simulcast local news and weather cut-ins on weekday mornings during their respective national network shows. WGFL also aired a standalone 5:30 p.m. newscast which was canceled a few years later. On April 4, 2016, it began using Sinclair's standard music and graphics package, and was renamed CBS 4 News.

By October 2019, production of the newscast had been taken over by Sinclair's West Palm Beach CBS affiliate WPEC, using a secondary studio and set previously used by Sinclair's defunct American Sports Network.

On May 1, 2023, it was reported that WGFL would be discontinuing its CBS 4 News newscasts, effective May 12, with plans to lay off the entire news operation. The station now runs "nationally syndicated programming", such as Sinclair's news program The National News Desk, in lieu of locally produced newscasts.

== Technical information ==
=== Subchannels ===
The station's signal is multiplexed:

Subchannels of WGFL
Channel	Res.	Short name	Programming
28.1	1080i	CBS	CBS
28.2	1080i	MyTV	Independent with MyNetworkTV
28.3	1080i	NBC	NBC

=== Analog-to-digital conversion ===
WGFL ended regular programming on its analog signal, over UHF channel 53, on July 18, 2008. The station's digital signal broadcasts on its pre-transition UHF channel 28. It was one of very few big three affiliates permitted by the Federal Communications Commission (FCC) to cease analog transmission prior to the national digital switchover on June 12, 2009.

As part of the repacking process following the 2016–2017 FCC incentive auction, WGFL moved its UHF channel allocation number from 28 to 29 on January 17, 2020.

=== Former translators ===
WGFL formerly operated two analog translator stations, which rebroadcast its signal to other parts of the broadcast market:

Station	City of license	Channel	Former call signs	Notes
WMYG-LP (Note: WLCF/WMYG had operated as a translator of WGFL since the station's sign-on in 1997.)	Lake City	11 (VHF)	W15AG (1985–2001); WJXE-LP (2001–2002); WBFL-LP (2002–2003); WLCF-LP (2003–2006)	Became affiliate of MyNetworkTV on September 5, 2006; license canceled on November 18, 2015 (now on WGFL-DT2)
WYPN-CA (Note: WYPN became a translator of WGFL on July 15, 2002; it had previously operated as an independent station since 1994. It would later become a separate station when it picked up the UPN affiliation on December 1, 2004.)	Gainesville	45 (UHF)	W14CB (1994–1997); WJXE-LP (1997–2001)	Now WYME-CD and an affiliate of Antenna TV

== See also ==
- Channel 4 branded TV stations in the United States
- Channel 29 digital TV stations in the United States
- Channel 28 virtual TV stations in the United States
