= The National News Desk =

American television news program

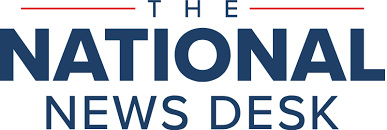
- Also known as: TNND
- Genre: News program; Current affairs; News magazine (weekend)
- Presented by: Jan Jeffcoat; Taylor Murray; Dee Dee Gatton
- Country of origin: United States
- Original language: English

Production
- Production locations: WJLA-TV studios, Rosslyn, Arlington, Virginia
- Camera setup: Multi-camera
- Running time: 180 minutes (morning); 30 minutes (early evening); 120 minutes (late evening); 60 minutes (weekend)
- Production company: Sinclair Broadcast Group

Original release
- Network: Sinclair Broadcast Group stations
- Release: January 18, 2021 – present

Related
- News Central; Circa News (social media accounts)

The National News Desk (TNND; originally The National Desk from January 2021 to September 2024) is a daily American television news program produced by the Sinclair Broadcast Group. The program premiered nationally on January 18, 2021, and utilizes the journalistic resources of Sinclair's news operations throughout the United States, as well as original content. It originates from the studios of flagship station WJLA-TV in the Washington, D.C. market.

== History ==
In June 2020, Sinclair announced it would launch "a headline news service" that would air weekday mornings (6:00–9:00 local time) and rely on news-gathering services of Sinclair's stations as well as original content, similar in format to NewsNation Prime produced by Nexstar Media Group for NewsNation.

The program would be titled The National Desk, and Sinclair tapped veteran news anchor Jan Jeffcoat to host the program. It launched on January 18, 2021, and airs on Sinclair's CW and MyNetworkTV-affiliated stations along with its independent and Fox-affiliated stations without any local newscasts or news share agreements.

The National Desk largely replaced paid programming, televangelism, and syndicated programming on those stations, reportedly saving Sinclair money in the long-run. The morning block also served as the replacement for Sinclair's attempt at non-educational children's programming, KidsClick, which had ended two years before.

On May 4, 2021, Sinclair announced an evening expansion of The National Desk on September 27. The two-hour evening block airs after network primetime in the Eastern and Central time zones, while leading into it in the Mountain and Pacific time zones.

On November 15, 2021, ABC affiliate WATM-TV in Altoona, Pennsylvania began airing The National Desk in place of where local newscasts would normally air, making it among Sinclair's first "Big Three" affiliated stations to air The National Desk. Prior to this, it was airing a newscast produced from LMA partner WJAC-TV in nearby Johnstown, Pennsylvania. Another LMA sister station, Fox affiliate WWCP-TV in Johnstown, will air The National Desk during WATM-TV's network commitments with ABC.

A weekend edition of the program was launched on Saturday, March 5, 2022, anchored by Eugene Ramirez, who also anchors the live desk during the weekday evening edition.

Recently, several "Big Four" stations owned or operated by Sinclair have replaced their local newscasts with The National Desk. On April 3, 2023, The National Desk began airing on WPMI in Mobile, Alabama; WEYI in Flint, Michigan; WACH in Columbia, South Carolina; and WGXA in Macon, Georgia (some local newscasts were retained on all of the above stations). On May 15 of that year, The National Desk was added on WNWO in Toledo, Ohio; KTVL in Medford, Oregon; KPTH in Sioux City, Iowa; WGFL in Gainesville, Florida; and KPTM in Omaha, Nebraska, as those news operations were shuttered.

== Political content ==
The National News Desk is described by Sinclair as a "comprehensive, commentary-free" news program, despite Sinclair historically requiring its local stations to broadcast conservative opinion must-run segments. University of Utah professor Josh McCrain described the program's coverage of political issues as "very partisan" and stated that the program was being viewed by older American voters, a very politically active demographic that tends to watch television more than younger adults.

=== Accusations of misinformation ===
The program has been accused by Media Matters for America of airing COVID-19 misinformation, inviting commentators from "anti-immigrant" organization FAIR, repeatedly airing a National Taxpayers Union falsehood regarding the cost of the INVEST in America Act, promoting efforts to counter inclusion of critical race theory in public schools, and concealing interviewees' support of Republican efforts to restrict voting while discussing election security.

The National News Desk has distributed multiple stories based on videos manipulated by the Republican National Committee. In one instance, a video distributed by the organization purported to show American president Joe Biden soiling himself.

== Format ==
Common segments on The National News Desk include Fact Check Team, which fact checks issues currently in political discourse (originally called the "truth squad team"); Spotlight on America, with reporting from Sinclair's investigative team on important issues impacting Americans; Pulse of America, featuring local reports from Sinclair stations across the country; Live Desk, an anchor who presents breaking news and developing stories; and a weather segment at the end of each half hour for the morning program, and at the end of each hour on the evening edition, featuring reports from Sinclair meteorologists reporting on their local region, in a cycle around the United States. The weather section can be replaced with local weather, news, or other programming for a specific market. The weekend edition is a summary of notable stories from the weekday editions, and is presented by the weeknight anchor.

The program airs on the ad-supported local news streaming service NewsOn (formerly owned by Sinclair until it was sold to the Gray Media-backed competitor Zeam in 2025), along with the live video section of nearly every Sinclair station site and app, allowing it national availability. The program does not air on Sinclair stations in every market due to network commitments or lack of a sister station entirely.

The program covered the 2024 United States presidential election on November 5, 2024 with an extended edition starting in prime time and into late night, airing on its usual stations and pre-empting a simulcast of Nexstar Media Group's cable news network NewsNation carried by the CW on its network affiliates.

=== The National Weather Desk ===
The National Weather Desk launched on September 26, 2022 as a half-hour spinoff of The National News Desk. The program features an extended look at top weather stories, a national forecast, local weather-related stories from Sinclair stations, explainers about weather events, and weather-related photos and videos from viewers. The last portion of each program is a cut-in to allow stations to present local forecasts or other content.
