= Channel 19 digital TV stations in the United States =

The following television stations broadcast on digital channel 19 in the United States:

- K19AA-D in Altus, Oklahoma
- K19AU-D in Omak, Okanogan, etc., Washington
- K19BK-D in Lakeview, Oregon
- K19BU-D in Pahrump, Nevada
- K19BY-D in Grangeville, etc., Idaho
- K19CG-D in Belle Fourche, South Dakota
- K19CM-D in Farmington, New Mexico
- K19CV-D in Redwood Falls, Minnesota, on virtual channel 29, which rebroadcasts WFTC
- K19CX-D in Yuma, Arizona
- K19CY-D in Rockland, Idaho
- K19DI-D in Crowley Lake - Long, California
- K19DQ-D in Montpelier, Idaho
- K19DS-D in Pitkin, Colorado
- K19DU-D in Summit County, Utah
- K19DY-D in Canon City, Colorado
- K19EC-D in Mapleton, Oregon
- K19EG-D in Holyoke, Colorado, on virtual channel 6, which rebroadcasts KRMA-TV
- K19EI-D in Pacific City/Cloverdale, Oregon, on virtual channel 7, which rebroadcasts KOAC-TV
- K19EU-D in Winnemucca, Nevada
- K19EW-D in Preston, Idaho, on virtual channel 13, which rebroadcasts KSTU
- K19EY-D in Myton, Utah
- K19FD-D in Camp Verde, Arizona
- K19FF-D in Miles City, Montana
- K19FG-D in Jackson, Wyoming
- K19FX-D in Laramie, Wyoming
- K19FZ-D in Elko, Nevada
- K19GA-D in Susanville, etc., California
- K19GB-D in Dove Creek, etc., Colorado, on virtual channel 19
- K19GD-D in Kalispell & Lakeside, Montana
- K19GH-D in Eugene, etc., Oregon
- K19GJ-D in Hatch, Utah
- K19GL-D in Yreka, California
- K19GM-D in Circleville, Utah
- K19GN-D in Mount Pleasant, Utah, on virtual channel 4, which rebroadcasts KTVX
- K19GS-D in Rural Beaver, etc., Utah
- K19GX-D in Buffalo, Wyoming
- K19HA-D in Navajo Mtn.Sch., etc., Utah
- K19HB-D in Oljeto, Utah
- K19HC-D in Hoehne, Colorado
- K19HE-D in Bluff, Utah
- K19HG-D in Redstone, Colorado
- K19HH-D in Midland, etc., Oregon
- K19HJ-D in Pinedale, etc., Wyoming
- K19HQ-D in Virgin, Utah
- K19HS-D in Grants Pass, Oregon
- K19HU-D in Montezuma Ck & Aneth, Utah
- K19HZ-D in Jackson, Minnesota
- K19ID-D in Green River, Utah
- K19IG-D in Mexican Hat, etc., Utah
- K19IH-D in Willmar, Minnesota, on virtual channel 42, which rebroadcasts KSAX
- K19IM-D in Duckwater, Nevada
- K19IP-D in Flagstaff, Arizona, on virtual channel 19
- K19IS-D in Inyokern, California, on virtual channel 21, which rebroadcasts KZGN-LD
- K19IU-D in Battle Mountain, Nevada
- K19IX-D in Romeo, Colorado
- K19JA-D in Cortez, Colorado
- K19JC-D in Mazama, Washington
- K19JJ-D in Vale, Oregon
- K19JM-D in Emigrant, Montana
- K19JO-D in Harlowton, etc., Montana
- K19JQ-D in Big Sandy, Montana
- K19JR-D in Wolf Point, Montana
- K19JW-D in Mauna Loa, Hawaii
- K19JX-D in Yakima, Washington
- K19KE-D in Jolly, Texas
- K19KN-D in Eads, etc., Colorado
- K19KP-D in Hermiston, Oregon
- K19KQ-D in Orderville, Utah
- K19KT-D in Hobbs, New Mexico
- K19KU-D in Walla Walla, Washington
- K19KV-D in Prescott, Arizona
- K19KW-D in Greybull, Wyoming
- K19KX-D in Keokuk, Iowa
- K19KY-D in Pocatello, Idaho
- K19LA-D in Rocky Ford, Colorado
- K19LC-D in Pagosa Springs, Colorado
- K19LD-D in Bayfield, Colorado
- K19LF-D in Koosharem, Utah
- K19LG-D in Rural Garfield County, Utah
- K19LH-D in Teasdale, etc., Utah
- K19LI-D in St. James, Minnesota
- K19LJ-D in Frost, Minnesota
- K19LK-D in Panguitch, Utah
- K19LL-D in Henrieville, Utah
- K19LM-D in Cody/Powell, Wyoming
- K19LN-D in Mayfield, Utah
- K19LO-D in Rural Sevier County, Utah
- K19LP-D in Clovis, New Mexico
- K19LR-D in Huntsville, etc., Utah, on virtual channel 30, which rebroadcasts KUCW
- K19LS-D in Walker Lake, Nevada
- K19LT-D in Prineville, etc., Oregon
- K19LU-D in Cedar City, Utah, on virtual channel 16, which rebroadcasts KUPX-TV
- K19LV-D in St. George, Utah, on virtual channel 9, which rebroadcasts KUEN
- K19LW-D in Sterling, Colorado, on virtual channel 9, which rebroadcasts KUSA
- K19LY-D in Scipio, Utah
- K19LZ-D in Las Cruces & Organ, New Mexico
- K19MA-D in Leamington, Utah
- K19MC-D in Bonnerdale, Arkansas
- K19MD-D in Orangeville, Utah, on virtual channel 9, which rebroadcasts KUEN
- K19ME-D in Overton, Nevada
- K19MF-D in East Carbon County, Utah
- K19MG-D in Rawlins, Wyoming
- K19MH-D in Fruitland, Nevada
- K19MI-D in Salem, Oregon, on virtual channel 49, which rebroadcasts K18EL-D
- K19MJ-D in Yerington, Nevada
- K19MK-D in Lake Tahoe, Nevada
- K19ML-D in Wray, Colorado, on virtual channel 7, which rebroadcasts KMGH-TV
- K19MM-D in Ruth, Nevada
- K19MN-D in Lake George, Colorado
- K19MP-D in Gallup, New Mexico
- K19NB-D in Gustine, California
- K19NE-D in Gateway, Colorado
- K19NF-D in Socorro, New Mexico
- KAJN-CD in Lafayette, Louisiana
- KAMR-TV in Amarillo, Texas
- KARD in West Monroe, Louisiana
- KAUT-TV in Oklahoma City, Oklahoma, an ATSC 3.0 station
- KBBV-CD in Bakersfield, California
- KBCB in Bellingham, Washington, on virtual channel 24
- KBJR-TV in Superior, Wisconsin
- KCBB-LD in Boise, Idaho
- KCKA in Centralia, Washington, on virtual channel 15
- KCKS-LD in Kansas City, Kansas, on virtual channel 25
- KCOY-TV in Santa Maria, California
- KDMI in Des Moines, Iowa
- KDOS-LD in Globe, Arizona
- KFBI-LD in Medford, Oregon
- KGBS-CD in Austin, Texas
- KGRX-LD in Gila River Indian Community, Arizona, an ATSC 3.0 station, on virtual channel 19
- KHDF-CD in Las Vegas, Nevada
- KIDY in San Angelo, Texas
- KIKU in Honolulu, Hawaii
- KIPB-LD in Pine Bluff, Arkansas
- KJYK-LD in Beaumont, Texas
- KJZZ-TV in Salt Lake City, Utah, an ATSC 3.0 station, on virtual channel 14
- KKAC in Carlsbad, New Mexico
- KKTW-LD in Minneapolis, Minnesota, on virtual channel 19
- KLBB-LD in Lubbock, Texas
- KLDO-TV in Laredo, Texas
- KMOH-TV in Kingman, Arizona
- KMPH-CD in Merced-Mariposa, California
- KMUM-CD in Sacramento, California, on virtual channel 33, which rebroadcasts KCSO-LD
- KOBS-LD in San Antonio, Texas
- KOTV-DT in McAlester, Oklahoma
- KPBS in San Diego, California, on virtual channel 15
- KPIC in Roseburg, Oregon
- KPRY-TV in Pierre, South Dakota
- KPTN-LD in St. Louis, Missouri, on virtual channel 7
- KRMA-TV (DRT) in Fort Collins, Colorado, on virtual channel 6
- KSBS-CD in Denver, Colorado, on virtual channel 10, which rebroadcasts KCDO-TV
- KSCC in Corpus Christi, Texas
- KSTS in San Jose, California, on virtual channel 48
- KTEV-LD in Texarkana, Arkansas
- KTGF-LD in Great Falls, Montana
- KTTU in Tucson, Arizona
- KTVT in Fort Worth, Texas, on virtual channel 11
- KTXH in Houston, Texas, on virtual channel 20
- KUES in Richfield, Utah, on virtual channel 19, which rebroadcasts KUED
- KUFS-LD in Fort Smith, Arkansas
- KUMN-LD in Moses Lake, etc., Washington
- KVBA-LD in Alamogordo, New Mexico
- KVRR in Fargo, North Dakota
- KWCH-DT in Hutchinson, Kansas
- KWKS in Colby, Kansas
- KWWE-LD in Lake Charles, Louisiana
- KWYB in Butte, Montana
- KXCH-LD in Chico, California
- KXMA-TV in Dickinson, North Dakota
- KXNE-TV in Norfolk, Nebraska
- KYTV in Springfield, Missouri
- W19CO-D in Pensacola, Florida
- W19DB-D in Franklin, North Carolina
- W19DN-D in Macon, Georgia
- W19DP-D in La Crosse, Wisconsin
- W19DW-D in Columbus, Georgia
- W19EE-D in Jacksonville, Illinois
- W19EF-D in Greenville, Mississippi
- W19EM-D in Melbourne, Florida
- W19EN-D in River Falls, Wisconsin
- W19EP-D in Culebra, Puerto Rico
- W19ET-D in Bath, New York
- W19EW-D in Evansville, Indiana
- W19EX-D in Gainesville, Florida
- W19EY-D in Toa Baja, Puerto Rico, on virtual channel 25
- W19EZ-D in Houghton Lake, Michigan
- W19FA-D in Bangor, Maine
- W19FB-D in Traverse City, Michigan
- W19FD-D in Terre Haute, Indiana
- WANF in Atlanta, Georgia, on virtual channel 46
- WAVY-TV in Portsmouth, Virginia
- WBPI-CD in Augusta, Georgia
- WBWP-LD in West Palm Beach, Florida
- WBYD-CD in Pittsburgh, Pennsylvania, on virtual channel 39
- WCLL-CD in Columbus, Ohio, on virtual channel 19
- WCZU-LD in Bowling Green, Kentucky
- WDKY-TV in Danville, Kentucky
- WDSU in New Orleans, Louisiana
- WECY-LD in Elmira, New York
- WEPA-LD in Erie, Pennsylvania
- WESH (DRT) in Ocala, Florida, on virtual channel 2
- WEYW-LP in Key West, Florida, on virtual channel 19
- WFND-LD in Findlay, Ohio
- WFTV (DRT) in Deltona, Florida, on virtual channel 9
- WGN-TV in Chicago, Illinois, on virtual channel 9
- WGSR-LD in Reidsville, North Carolina
- WHNT-TV in Huntsville, Alabama
- WIIQ in Demopolis, Alabama
- WIPB in Muncie, Indiana, on virtual channel 49
- WIYC in Troy, Alabama
- WJAX-TV in Jacksonville, Florida
- WKPZ-CD in Kingsport, Tennessee
- WKYC in Cleveland, Ohio, on virtual channel 3
- WLLC-LD in Nashville, Tennessee, on virtual channel 42
- WLWK-CD in Sturgeon Bay, Wisconsin
- WMMF-LD in Vero Beach, Florida
- WMTV in Madison, Wisconsin
- WODR-LD in Wausau, Wisconsin
- WOOT-LD in Chattanooga, Tennessee
- WPED-LD in Jackson, Tennessee
- WPSD-TV in Paducah, Kentucky
- WQTO in Ponce, Puerto Rico, on virtual channel 26
- WRUE-LD in Salisbury, Maryland
- WSBS-CD in Miami, etc., Florida, on virtual channel 22, which rebroadcasts WSBS-TV
- WSFJ-TV in London, Ohio, uses WCLL-CD's spectrum, on virtual channel 51
- WSIO-LD in Galesburg, Illinois
- WSOC-TV in Charlotte, North Carolina, on virtual channel 9
- WSPZ-LD in DuBois, Pennsylvania
- WSTM-TV in Syracuse, New York, and ATSC 3.0 station.
- WSYT in Syracuse, New York
- WTKJ-LD in Watertown, New York
- WTLH in Bainbridge, Georgia
- WTOG in St. Petersburg, Florida, on virtual channel 44
- WTPX-TV in Antigo, Wisconsin
- WUNC-TV (DRT) in Raleigh, North Carolina, on virtual channel 4
- WUTF-TV at Worcester, Massachusetts, on virtual channel 27
- WVGN-LD in Charlotte Amalie, U.S. Virgin Islands
- WXMI in Grand Rapids, Michigan
- WYDO in Greenville, North Carolina
- WYPX-TV in Amsterdam, New York
- WZBJ-CD in Lynchburg, Virginia
- WZMQ in Marquette, Michigan

The following stations, which are no longer licensed, formerly broadcast on digital channel 19 in the United States:

- K19FH-D in Aspen, Colorado
- K19IC-D in Eureka, California
- K19LX-D in Granite Falls, Minnesota
- K19MB-D in Mountain Home, Idaho
- K19MS-D in Alexandra, Minnesota
- K19MZ-D in Arriba, Colorado
- K19NA-D in Idaho Falls, Idaho
- KFJK-LD in Santa Fe, New Mexico
- KGHZ in Springfield, Missouri
- KJII-LD in Lincoln, Nebraska
- KNTS-LP in Natchitoches, Louisiana
- W19DD-D in Brevard, North Carolina
- W19DV-D in Luquillo, Puerto Rico
- W19EB-D in Lumberton, Mississippi
- WBKI-TV in Campbellsville, Kentucky
- WDXA-LD in Florence, South Carolina
- WEMW-CD in Greensburg, Pennsylvania
- WFKB-LD in Midland, Michigan
