= KZCO-LD =

Television station in Denver

Translator of KMGH-DT2, Denver, Colorado
- Denver, Colorado; United States
- Channels: Digital: 30 (UHF), shared with KLPD-LD; Virtual: 3.3 and 3.4, 7.2 and 7.3
- Branding: see KMGH-TV

Programming
- Affiliations: 3.3: QVC2; 3.4: Shop LC; 7.2: Ion Mystery; 7.3: Laff

Ownership
- Owner: E. W. Scripps Company; (Scripps Broadcasting Holdings LLC)
- Sister stations: KMGH-TV

History
- Founded: 2002
- First air date: 2003
- Last air date: August 11, 2014 (as KZCO-LP)
- Former call signs: KCIN-LP (2003–2005); KZCO-LP (2005–2014)
- Former channel numbers: Analog: 27 (UHF, 2003–2014); Digital: 17 (UHF, 2013–2020)
- Former affiliations: Independent (2002–2003); Azteca América (2003–2013); ABC (via KMGH-TV, 2013–2021)
- Call sign meaning: Azteca América Colorado (former affiliation)

Technical information
- Licensing authority: FCC
- Facility ID: 168782
- Class: LD
- ERP: 15 kW
- HAAT: 231.1 m (758 ft)
- Transmitter coordinates: 39°43′45.9″N 105°14′9.9″W

Links
- Public license information: LMS

KZCO-LD is a low-power television station in Denver, Colorado, United States. It rebroadcasts four secondary digital subchannels of ABC affiliate KMGH-TV (channel 7), including Ion Mystery on 7.3 and Laff on 7.4. Like KMGH-TV and KCDO-TV (channel 3), as well as KSBS-CD (channel 10), KZCO-LD is owned and operated by the E. W. Scripps Company. KZCO-LD shares a channel with KLPD-LD (channel 28), owned by Syncom Media Group, and transmits from atop Lookout Mountain, near Golden; its parent station maintains studios on Delgany Street in Denver's River North Art District.

== History ==
The license history for KZCO-LD dates back to 1971, when it was authorized in Estes Park, Colorado, as K65AA. This was one of five UHF translators authorized to Translator TV, Inc., to rebroadcast Denver stations. In 2003, it moved to channel 27 as K27GF, soon changed to KCIN-LP.

In 2005, the McGraw-Hill Company, owner of KMGH-TV, acquired KZCO-LP and used it as one of several transmitters for a regional Azteca América service, broadcast from transmitters in Denver (KZCO-LP), Windsor for Fort Collins and Greeley (KZFC-LD), and Colorado Springs (KZCS-LD). On October 3, 2011, McGraw-Hill announced that it would exit from broadcasting and sell KMGH-TV, KZCO-LP and its other television stations to the E. W. Scripps Company. The sale was completed on December 30, 2011.

In 2013, KZCO signed on a digital signal on UHF channel 17 to serve as a fill-in translator of KMGH-TV, which has experienced issues with signal reception in portions of the Denver market since the digital television transition on June 12, 2009, due to that station operating its digital signal on VHF channel 7, which is prone to signal interference.

On August 11, 2014, the FCC canceled the KZCO-LP license, being replaced by KZCO-LD.

In early 2021, the simulcast of KMGH-TV's main channel moved to a subchannel of KSBS-CD, a translator of KCDO-TV.

== Subchannels ==
Scripps uses major channels 3 and 7, as extensions and simulcasts of KMGH-TV. KMGH-TV also broadcasts the 3.3 and 3.4 subchannels. Syncom's KLPD-LD uses major channel 28.

The stations' signals are multiplexed:

Subchannels of KZCO-LD (3.x, 7.x) and KLPD-LD (28.x)
License	Channel	Res.	Short name	Programming
KZCO-LD	3.3	480i	Newsnet	QVC2 (KMGH-TV)
KZCO-LD	3.4	480i	Shop-LC	Shop LC (KMGH-TV)
KZCO-LD	7.2	480i	MYS	Ion Mystery (KMGH-TV)
KZCO-LD	7.3	480i	24/7	Laff (KMGH-TV)
KLPD-LD	28.1	720p	MTN TV	MTN-TV (Outside TV)
KLPD-LD	28.2	480i	Movies	Movies!
KLPD-LD	28.3	480i	Decades	HSN2

Simulcast of subchannels of another station
