= KMAS =

KMAS may refer to:

- KMAS (AM), a radio station (1030 AM) licensed to serve Shelton, Washington, United States
- KMAS-LD, a defunct low-power television station (channel 33) formerly licensed to serve Denver, Colorado, United States
- KMHC, a television station (channel 10, virtual 24) licensed to Steamboat Springs, Colorado, United States, which used the KMAS-TV call sign from 2000 to 2007
- Korean Music Awards, a South Korean music awards show
