= KWGN-TV =

Television station in Denver

ATSC 3.0 station
- Denver, Colorado; United States
- Channels: Digital: 34 (UHF); Virtual: 2
- Branding: Colorado's Own Channel 2; Colorado's CW 2 (during promos for CW network shows)

Programming
- Affiliations: 2.1: The CW; for others, see § Subchannels

Ownership
- Owner: Nexstar Media Group; (Tribune Media Company)
- Sister stations: KDVR/KFCT; Tegna: KUSA, KTVD

History
- First air date: July 18, 1952
- Former call signs: KFEL-TV (1952–1955); KTVR (1955–1963); KCTO (1963–1966)
- Former channel number: Analog: 2 (VHF, 1952–2009)
- Former affiliations: DuMont (1952–1956); Independent (1956–1995); NTA (secondary, 1956–1961); The WB (1995–2006)
- Call sign meaning: "World's Greatest Newspaper" (named after sister station WGN-TV; refers to former corporate cousin, the Chicago Tribune)

Technical information
- Licensing authority: FCC
- Facility ID: 35883
- ERP: 1,000 kW
- HAAT: 336 m (1,102 ft)
- Transmitter coordinates: 39°43′58″N 105°14′10″W
- Translator(s): see § Translators

Links
- Public license information: Public file; LMS
- Website: kdvr.com

KWGN-TV (channel 2) is a television station in Denver, Colorado, United States, serving as the local outlet for The CW. It is owned by Nexstar Media Group alongside Fox affiliate KDVR (channel 31); Nexstar's Tegna subsidiary owns KUSA (channel 9), an NBC affiliate, and KTVD (channel 20), an independent station with MyNetworkTV. KWGN-TV and KDVR share studios on East Speer Boulevard in Denver's Speer neighborhood; KWGN-TV's transmitter is located atop Lookout Mountain, near Golden.

KWGN is available to subscribers of satellite provider Dish Network throughout the United States as part of its superstations package (for grandfathered subscribers that purchased the a la carte tier before Dish halted sales of the package to new subscribers in September 2013), and is carried on cable television providers in parts of the western United States. The station is authorized for cable and satellite distribution as a U.S. superstation by the Canadian Radio-television and Telecommunications Commission (CRTC); however, KWGN is not currently available on any pay television providers in that country.

== History ==
=== Early years ===
The station first signed on the air as KFEL-TV on July 18, 1952. It was owned by Colorado broadcasting pioneer Gene O'Fallon along with Denver's second radio station, KFEL (AM 950, now KKSE), and was the first television station to sign on in the state of Colorado. It was also first station on the VHF band to sign on the air following the Federal Communications Commission's decision to lift its freeze on television station licenses that year. The station originally operated as a primary affiliate of the DuMont Television Network, sharing the affiliation with KBTV (channel 9, now NBC affiliate KUSA), but also cherry-picked programs from NBC, ABC and CBS. The station's original studio facilities were located in a remodeled brick warehouse at 550 Lincoln Street.

Gotham Broadcasting, owned by J. Elroy McCaw (who also owned radio station WINS in New York City), purchased the station from O'Fallon in 1955. John M. Shaheen, the founder of aviation services company Tele-Trip Inc., which later became a subsidiary of Mutual of Omaha, subsequently acquired a 50% ownership interest in the station. Channel 2's call letters were changed that same year to KTVR; the station lost the DuMont affiliation when the network shut down on August 6, 1956, after which it became an independent station. During the late 1950s, the station was briefly affiliated with the NTA Film Network. In 1959, McCaw became the sole owner of channel 2, buying out Shaheen's share in the station. In 1963, McCaw changed the call letters to KCTO (for "Channel Two").

=== Under Tribune ownership ===
In September 1965, the station was acquired by Tribune Broadcasting – then known as WGN Continental Broadcasting. After the sale was finalized in March 1966, the new owners changed the call letters to KWGN-TV after its new sister station and the company's flagship, WGN-TV in Chicago (the WGN calls refer to the longtime slogan of the company's former flagship newspaper, the Chicago Tribune, "World's Greatest Newspaper"; the newspaper division was split into a separate company in August 2014). At the time of its purchase, KWGN became Tribune's fourth television station property—after WGN-TV, WPIX in New York City, and KDAL-TV (now KDLH) in Duluth, Minnesota, the latter of which was owned by Tribune from 1960 to 1978.

When WGN Continental Broadcasting bought channel 2, it gave the station a significant technical overhaul, allowing it to broadcast programming in color. KWGN promoted itself as Colorado's only all-color station, because all of its local programs were produced in the format. Denver's three major network affiliates—KOA-TV (channel 4, now KCNC-TV), KLZ-TV (channel 7, now KMGH-TV) and KBTV—were broadcasting national network programs in color, but had yet to equip their studios with color cameras for local programming production. As an independent station, KWGN aired a mix of off-network sitcoms and dramas, cartoons, movies, syndicated game shows, and locally produced programs such as Blinky's Fun Club, Denver Now, Afternoon at the Movies with Tom Shannon and public affairs program Your Right to Say It. It took six years for WGN Continental to make the station profitable.

Beginning in the 1960s, the station started building a massive network of translators across the state. Around this time, KWGN became a regional superstation (long before that term was coined and popularized by Atlanta station WTBS). At its height, it was available on nearly every cable system in Colorado and Wyoming, as well as portions of Idaho, Kansas, Montana, Nebraska, New Mexico, South Dakota, Utah and Washington. KWGN was attractive to cable systems because its programming had no duplication with programs seen on the local network affiliates within their given markets. Additionally, it was the only independent station that was available in much of the region until the 1980s. It remained the only independent station in Denver—and indeed, in all of Colorado—until eventual sister station KDVR (channel 31) signed on in August 1983. To this day, KWGN remains available on most cable systems in Colorado and Wyoming, as well as on several systems in western Nebraska and Kansas.

The station moved its operations from the Lincoln Street facility to a new building in suburban Greenwood Village in 1983. As one of the strongest independent stations in the country, KWGN was approached by Fox to affiliate with the upstart network upon its October 1986 debut. However, channel 2 turned the offer down. Station and company officials were skeptical of Fox's business model, and were confident enough in KWGN's schedule that they felt they didn't need a network affiliation. However, most Fox affiliates were essentially programmed as independents until the network began airing a full week's worth of programming in 1993, so KWGN would not have had to give up many of its syndicated shows. Additionally, by this time, most of the smaller markets in its vast cable footprint had enough stations to provide Fox affiliates at the outset, making the prospect of KWGN as a multi-state Fox affiliate unattractive to Tribune. The affiliation instead went to KDVR.

=== WB affiliation ===
On November 2, 1993, the Warner Bros. Television division of Time Warner and the Tribune Company announced the creation of The WB Television Network; KWGN and the majority of Tribune's other independent stations (except for Atlanta's WGNX, which joined CBS one month prior to The WB's launch) were tapped to serve as the nuclei for the new network. KWGN became a charter affiliate of The WB when it launched on January 11, 1995; however, its existing lineup was largely unaffected at first, since The WB initially ran programming only on Wednesday evenings, gradually adding additional nights of programming between September 1995 and September 1999; by that time, the network offered prime time programming on Sunday through Friday evenings, along with children's programming on weekdays and Saturday mornings.

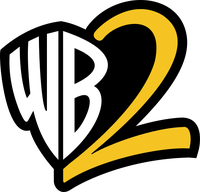
KWGN logo 1996

In October 1995, Fox Television Stations proposed a divestiture of KDVR—which it had acquired from Renaissance Broadcasting three months earlier in exchange for its former owned-and-operated station in Dallas, KDAF (now a sister station to KWGN), which had lost Fox programming to that market's longtime CBS affiliate, KDFW, in a groupwide affiliation deal with Fox and then-KDFW owner, New World Communications—to Qwest Broadcasting, a company backed by Quincy Jones and Tribune Broadcasting. In the sale proposal, Fox would have moved its programming to KWGN, while the WB affiliation would have moved to KDVR after the sale to Qwest was finalized. However, this deal never came to fruition.

In 1996, the station altered its longstanding "Denver's 2" branding to "Denver's WB2", to reflect its network affiliation; the "WB2" branding continued to be used in some form for the remainder of KWGN's tenure with the network. During its existence as a WB affiliate, KWGN also served as the network's default affiliate for most of Colorado, including the Colorado Springs–Pueblo and Grand Junction markets—a status that was reflected under the "WB2 Colorado" moniker that was used during the final years of The WB's run.

=== CW affiliation ===
On January 24, 2006, Time Warner and CBS Corporation announced that the two companies would shut down The WB and UPN and combine the respective programming from the two networks to create a new "fifth" network called The CW. With the announcement, Tribune Broadcasting signed ten-year agreements for KWGN and 16 of the company's 18 other WB-affiliated stations (three of which it would sell to other groups shortly before The CW launched) to become charter affiliates of The CW. In preparation for the affiliation switch, the station retitled its newscasts from WB 2 News to News 2 on August 14, 2006. The affiliation switch took place on September 18, 2006, the day after The WB ended operations, upon which it changed its general branding to "CW 2" (former UPN affiliate KTVD (channel 20) would end up affiliating with MyNetworkTV, whose launch was announced by News Corporation nearly one month after the CW launch announcement on February 22).

On July 7, 2008, KWGN removed references to its CW affiliation from its branding in both station promotions and its on-air logo, as part of a decision by Tribune Broadcasting to de-emphasize the network brand from its CW-affiliated stations as a result of the network's relatively weak ratings, choosing to reposition them as more "local" stations; KWGN began referring to itself simply as "2", featuring the CW branding era's "2" logotype within a solid circle logo.

==== LMA and legal duopoly with KDVR ====
On September 17, 2008, Tribune Company announced that it would enter KWGN into a local marketing agreement with Local TV, owners of Fox affiliate KDVR, effective on October 1, 2008, as a result of the formation of a "broadcast management company" that was created to provide management services to stations owned by both Tribune Broadcasting and Local TV. Although it was the longer-established of the two stations, KWGN served as the junior partner in the virtual duopoly. As a result, the station would migrate its operations into KDVR's studio facility on Speer Boulevard in downtown Denver (based at the same location where KWGN's original studios were located during the station's first 30 years on the air). The move resulted in both stations combining their news departments and sharing certain syndicated programming.

On March 30, 2009, KWGN changed its on-air branding once again to "2 the Deuce", in an attempt to appeal to younger viewers and become more involved in local issues. On March 1, 2010, the locally produced talk show Everyday with Libby and Natalie (which debuted in 2008) was renamed as simply Everyday and moved to KWGN from KDVR (effectively changing timeslots as a result moving from late afternoons to late mornings with the program's station switch); Libby Weaver co-hosted the program with Natalie Tysdal until June 1, 2009, after which Weaver was replaced by Chris Parente. After Peter Maroney took over as general manager of KDVR/KWGN following the 2009 departure of Dennis Leonard, other noticeable changes to the station took hold with the locally produced consumer talk program Martino TV (which also moved to KDVR) being replaced in its 11 a.m. timeslot by repeats of Maury.

In May 2010, KWGN dropped "The Deuce" branding and temporarily began to simply identify by the station's call letters. The following month, the station changed its website domain from 2thedeuce.com to KWGN.com to reflect the branding change; that September, the station rebranded itself as "Channel 2, The CW". That fall, the station dropped Live! with Regis and Kelly from its schedule, which moved to sister station KDVR; this left WGN-TV (which itself lost rights to the talk show in September 2013) and St. Louis sister station KPLR-TV as the only Tribune-owned stations and two of the few CW affiliates that carry the show. On July 22, 2011, KWGN debuted a new on-air appearance and branding (becoming known as "Colorado's Own Channel 2", resembling the former "Denver's 2" identity from the 1980s and early 1990s plus the "Chicago's Very Own" slogan used by WGN-TV), as well as reformatting its local news programming to a more traditional format. On July 1, 2013, Tribune announced it would purchase Local TV outright for $2.75 billion. The sale was finalized on December 27, creating a legal duopoly between KDVR and KWGN.

==== Sinclair purchase attempt; sale to Nexstar ====
In May 2017, Sinclair Broadcast Group announced its intention to buy Tribune Media. KDVR was then identified as one of 23 stations that Sinclair would divest to obtain regulatory approval for the merger, with Fox Television Stations agreeing to a repurchase as part of a $910 million deal. Both transactions were nullified on August 9, 2018, following Tribune Media's termination of the merger agreement and FCC chairman Ajit Pai's public rejection of the deal.

Nexstar Media Group announced it would acquire the assets of Tribune Media on December 3, 2018, for $6.4 billion in cash and debt. The deal closed on September 19, 2019.

On August 19, 2025, Nexstar Media Group agreed to acquire Tegna for $6.2 billion. In Denver, Tegna already owned KUSA and KTVD. The deal was approved and completed on March 19, 2026. As part of the transaction, Nexstar committed to the divestiture of KTVD within two years, along with five other stations in markets where the two companies combined held four TV station licenses.

== Programming ==
=== Sports coverage ===
KWGN served as the over-the-air flagship home of Major League Baseball's Colorado Rockies from their inaugural season in 1993 to 2002 and the NBA's Denver Nuggets in 1990–91 and again from 1995 to 2004.

=== News operation ===
KWGN-TV presently broadcasts 36 hours of locally produced newscasts each week (with six hours each weekday and three hours each on Saturdays and Sundays). There is a considerable amount of sharing between KWGN and KDVR in regards to news coverage, video footage and the use of reporters; though both outlets maintain their own primary on-air personalities (such as news anchors and meteorologists) that only appear on one station; several KWGN on-air staffers that remained with the station after the LMA was formed simultaneously joined KDVR's news department with the consolidation of news operations. Combined with sister KDVR, Nexstar's Denver properties broadcast a combined 90 hours of local news, making it the highest output in the state of Colorado.

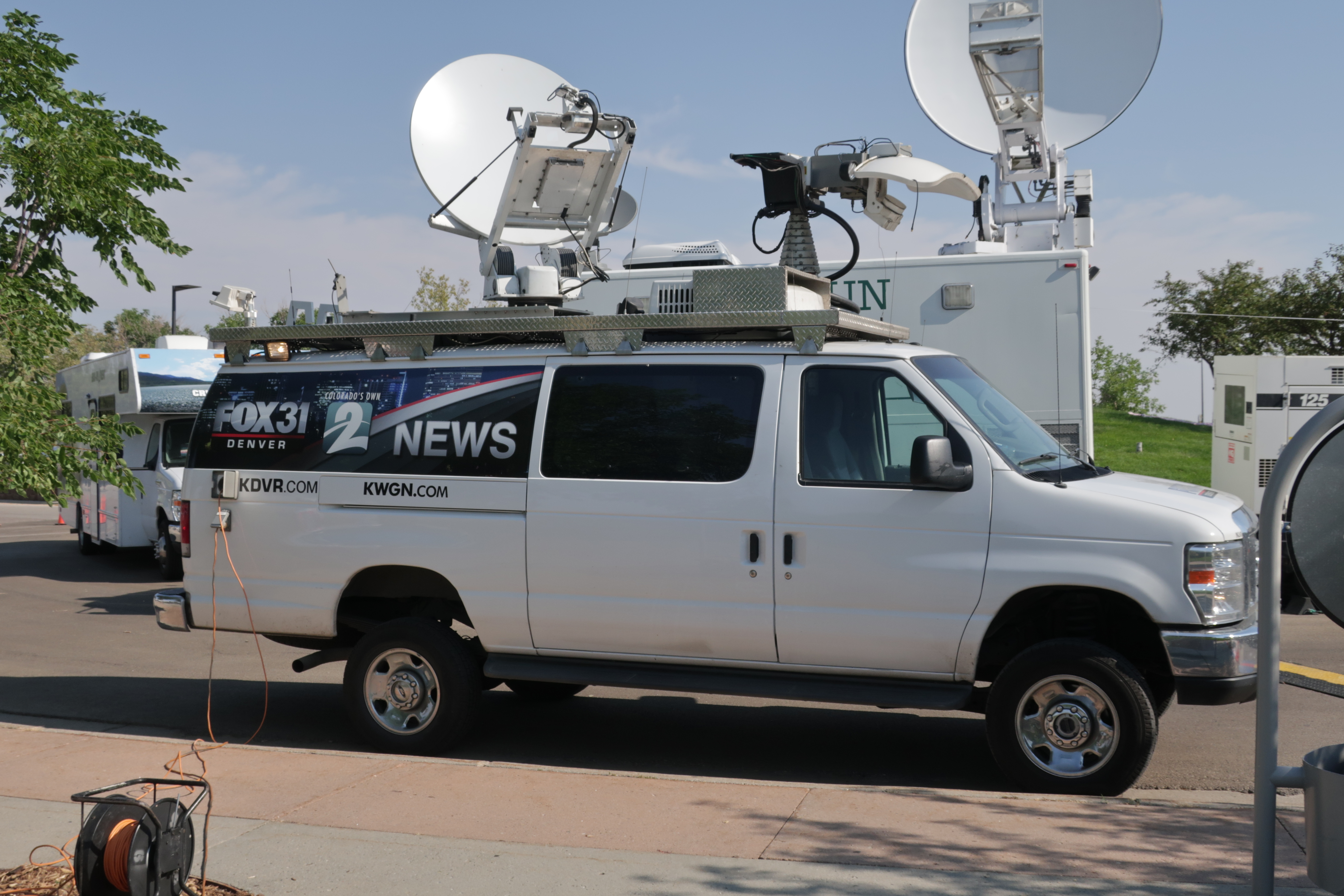
A KDVR and KWGN outside broadcasting van in Casper, Wyoming during the 2017 total solar eclipse

Channel 2 was the first television station in the Denver market to air a locally produced nightly prime time newscast. The 9 p.m. newscast, which debuted shortly after the station signed on, remained a constant through several ownership changes. In 1966, the newscast was expanded to one hour—becoming the only hour-long newscast in the market at that point. Titled The Big News, the program heavily concentrated on local stories because filmed national and international news reports were not available through news feeds to stations that lacked a network affiliation during that period. If a major national story occurred, anchor Ron Voigt would read the wire copy while black-and-white wire photos supplied by the Associated Press were shown on-camera.

From the late 1960s until 1975, The Big News had two regular commentators to provide news analysis, George Salem and Gene Amole. The final segment of the newscast was titled "Speak Out" and was often devoted to phone calls from viewers. The program was also known for its meteorologist, Ed Bowman (known as "Weatherman Bowman"), who came to KWGN from KOA-TV-AM. Bowman frequently discussed the jet stream during his forecast segment, which he represented on-air by drawing large arcs over a map of the continental United States. The station's sports director during the 1960s and early 1970s was Fred Leo, who had provided play-by-play analysis for many of the area's professional sports teams. KWGN's newscast grew to be a strong competitor to the prime time network programs it competed against in the 9 p.m. timeslot on KBTV/KUSA, KOA-TV/KCNC and KLZ-TV/KMGH.

The first time that KWGN programmed news outside its established 9 p.m. slot was in 1982, when it premiered a midday newscast at noon. The station attempted another midday newscast beginning in 1997, this time at 11AM and running for an hour. WB2 News at Eleven lasted three years, and was cancelled in the fall of 2000. On July 16, 2000, legitimate competition sprang up for KWGN's prime time newscast for the first time when KDVR debuted the hour-long Fox 31 News at 9 O'Clock, which gradually became an avid competitor to KWGN's longer-established late newscast. Also in 2000, the station debuted a weekday morning newscast titled WB2day (which eventually adopted the present title Daybreak in 2012), a mix of news, entertainment and lifestyle features that initially aired for three hours from 6 to 9 a.m. In 2004, KWGN added an hour onto the newscast from 5 to 6 a.m., expanding it to four hours. The program grew to beat competing local and national morning news programs in certain age demographics. An 11 a.m. newscast returned to the schedule on September 11, 2006. On July 7, 2008, KWGN branched out its news programming into early evenings for the first time with the launch of a half-hour 5:30 p.m. newscast, anchored by Kellie MacMullan and Ernie Bjorkman. One month later on August 4, 2008, the station expanded its 11 a.m. newscast to one hour.

After entering into the local marketing agreement with KDVR, major changes were made to KWGN's news programming. First on January 12, 2009, the station discontinued its 5:30 p.m. newscast as KDVR expanded its own early evening newscast to an hour starting at 5 p.m. On March 2, 2009, KWGN moved its newscasts to a temporary set in preparation for its March 30 move from its Greenwood Village facility to KDVR's studios on Speer Boulevard. Subsequently, on March 30, when KWGN's operations were formally integrated with KDVR, channel 2 shifted its flagship 9 p.m. newscast to 7 p.m. to avoid competing with KDVR's prime time newscast; as a result, the newscast traded time slots with The CW's prime time schedule, which the station began airing on a one-hour delay from 8 to 10 p.m. at the network's permission (this also effectively resulted in the newscast being reduced to airing only on Monday through Friday evenings in part due to The CW airing a three-hour prime time lineup on Sundays at the time; although The CW turned its Sunday prime time slots over to the network's affiliates in September 2009, the 7 p.m. newscast remains a weeknight-only broadcast as of 2014). KWGN discontinued the 11 a.m. newscast once again on May 29, 2009, which was replaced the following Monday with Martino TV, a lifestyle program featuring paid segments from local businesses. At that time, KWGN began broadcasting its local newscasts in high definition.

On July 18, 2016, KWGN started a 4 p.m. weekday newscast. This newscast is anchored by current KWGN 7 p.m. anchor, Deborah Takahara, and longtime former Denver newsman Mike Landess. Mike returns to Denver from KYTX in Tyler, Texas. Landess previously anchored evening newscasts for KMGH and KUSA/KBTV in Denver.

On September 12, 2016, KWGN became the first station in the Mountain Time Zone to launch an 11 p.m. weeknight newscast hosted by Mike Barz and Erika Gonzalez.

Beginning March 27, 2017, Ernie Bjorkman, weeknight anchor from 1984 to 1988 and again from 1998 to 2008, returned to KWGN.

On September 23, 2017, KWGN expanded the hour-long 7 p.m. newscast to weekends for the first time since the newscast launched on March 30, 2009; this also marked the first time KWGN aired local news on weekends since 2009.

==== Notable former on-air staff ====
- Asha Blake – weeknight anchor (2004–2007)
- Tom Martino – consumer reporter and host of Martino TV (2009–2010)
- Russell Scott – host of Blinky's Fun Club and Captain Dooley (1966–1998)
- Tom Shannon – host of Afternoon at the Movies with Tom Shannon (1970s)

== Technical information ==
=== Subchannels ===
KWGN-TV offers four subchannels, which since conversion to ATSC 3.0 have been hosted on the multiplexes of three other Denver television stations:

Subchannels provided by KWGN-TV
Subchannel	Res.	Short name	Programming	ATSC 1.0 host
2.1	720p	KWGN-DT	The CW	KDVR
2.2	480i	CHARGE	Charge!	KUSA
2.3	480i	COMET	Comet	KMGH-TV
2.4	480i	HSN2	HSN2	KMGH-TV

=== Analog-to-digital conversion ===
KWGN shut down its analog signal, over VHF channel 2, on June 12, 2009, the official date on which full-power television stations in the United States transitioned from analog to digital broadcasts under federal mandate. The station's digital signal remained on its pre-transition UHF channel 34, using virtual channel 2.

=== ATSC 3.0 ===
Subchannels of KWGN-TV (ATSC 3.0)
Subchannel	Res.	Short name	Programming
2.1	720p	KWGN-DT	The CW
7.1	720p	KMGH-DT	ABC (KMGH-TV)
9.1	1080p	KUSA-HD	NBC (KUSA)
31.1	720p	KDVR-DT	Fox (KDVR)

Subchannel broadcast with digital rights management

On December 21, 2020, this station was launched as a lighthouse station for ATSC 3.0 (NextGen TV) in Denver. It currently carries the main program streams of KWGN, KMGH-TV, KUSA and KDVR.

=== Translators ===
- K31FZ-D Haxtun
- K34PT-D Julesburg
- K30FO-D Peetz
- K30GO-D Pleasant Valley
