= Daily Connection =

- Genre: News
- Country of origin: United States

Original release
- Release: September 2009 – July 25, 2011

Daily Connection is a daytime news and lifestyle program produced by NBC News in collaboration with the affiliates that aired it. The program featured a mix of original reporting and content from other NBCUniversal properties, most notably the TODAY show. Other contributing outlets included NBC News Channel, CNBC, MSNBC, The Weather Channel, Dateline, Bravo, Access Hollywood, and NBC News Mobile. Breaking local or national news was also aired.

Each broadcast's content was created by NBC News in New York, then sent to the stations, who produced the actual live broadcasts using their local anchors. This allowed stations to give their anchors more exposure, typically replacing a syndicated daytime program with an extra half-hour of news.

The show largely avoided political stories in favor of entertainment news, health issues, strange news, and investigative reports.

It aired on several NBC-affiliated stations around the country, both owned & operated as well as independent.

It started in September 14, 2009, on WRC in Washington and was rolled out to several other stations over the course of about a year.

The Daily Connection was last broadcast in July 2011 after Comcast decided to end the program.

Some NBC News reporters that were seen on the program were:

- Jeff Rossen
- Jenna Wolfe
- Courtney Hazlett
- Sara Haines
- Joelle Garguilo
- Kerry Sanders
- Mike Taibbi
- Ron Mott

== Affiliates ==
Monday-Friday

- WNBC-TV 12:30 PM ET
- KTVD-TV 11:00 AM MT
- KNBC-TV 12:00 PM PT
- WTVJ-TV 4:00 PM ET
- WRC-TV-DT2 7:00 PM ET
- KNBC

== Reception ==
Richard Huff of the New York Daily News said of Tracie Strahan and Erika Tarantal, the show's anchors, "they're trying way too hard to make the kind of silly chitchat that gives TV news a bad name" and called the pacing "slow".
