= KPXC-TV =

Television station in Denver

- Denver, Colorado; United States
- Channels: Digital: 18 (UHF); Virtual: 59

Programming
- Affiliations: 59.1: Ion Television; for others, see § Subchannels

Ownership
- Owner: Inyo Broadcast Holdings (sale to the E. W. Scripps Company pending); (Inyo Broadcast Licenses LLC)

History
- First air date: September 2, 1987
- Former call signs: KUBD (1987–1998)
- Former channel numbers: Analog: 59 (UHF, 1988–2010); Digital: 43 (UHF, 2010–2019)
- Former affiliations: Independent/FNN (1987–1989); Telemundo (1989–1995); inTV (1995−1998)
- Call sign meaning: Pax Colorado (reflecting network's former branding)

Technical information
- Licensing authority: FCC
- Facility ID: 68695
- ERP: 330 kW
- HAAT: 329.6 m (1,081 ft)
- Transmitter coordinates: 40°5′47.3″N 104°54′5.9″W

Links
- Public license information: Public file; LMS
- Website: iontelevision.com

KPXC-TV (channel 59) is a television station in Denver, Colorado, United States, affiliated with Ion Television. Owned by Inyo Broadcast Holdings, the station maintains offices on South Jamaica Court in Aurora, and its transmitter is located in rural southwestern Weld County, east of Frederick.

== History ==
The station first signed on the air on September 10, 1987, as KUBD. Originally operating as an independent station, the station aired financial news programming from the Financial News Network during the daytime hours and ran a general entertainment schedule at night. In 1989, KUBD became the original Denver area affiliate of the Spanish-language network Telemundo. FNN ceased operations two years later, when it was absorbed by CNBC. In 1995, KUBD was sold by its original ownership group (which included satellite TV entrepreneur Charlie Ergen) to Christian Network, Inc. (CNI), a non-profit organization co-founded by Bud Paxson, for $6.5 million. That year, KUBD switched to infomercial programming from inTV, and Telemundo programming moved to KSBS-TV (now KMHC). The CNI stations, including KUBD, were sold to Paxson Communications in 1996.

The station changed its call letters to KPXC-TV on February 2, 1998; KPXC became a charter owned-and-operated station of Paxson's new family-oriented broadcast network Pax TV (now Ion Television) when the network launched on August 31, 1998. In 2001, KPXC obtained the local television rights to carry select NHL games featuring the Colorado Avalanche; the deal to broadcast the games ended in 2003.

On December 15, 2014, Ion reached a deal to donate KPXC-TV's low-power repeater in Fort Collins, KPXH-LD (channel 25), to Word of God Fellowship, parent company of the Daystar Television Network.

Following E. W. Scripps Company's purchase of Ion Media in 2021, KPXC lost its status as an Ion owned-and-operated station when it was sold along with 22 other stations to Inyo Broadcast Holdings to comply with FCC rules (as Scripps had already owned KMGH-TV and KCDO-TV). Scripps announced its repurchase of all Inyo stations on February 26, 2026.

== Newscasts ==
In September 2001, as part of its joint sales agreement with that station (the result of an overall deal between Pax TV and NBC), KPXC-TV began airing tape delayed rebroadcasts of Gannett's NBC affiliate KUSA-TV (channel 9)'s 6 and 10 p.m. newscasts each Monday through Friday evening at 6:30 and 10:30 p.m. (the latter beginning shortly before that program's live broadcast ended on KUSA). The news rebroadcasts ended on June 30, 2005, when Pax's news share agreements with major network affiliates throughout the United States were terminated upon the network's rebranding as i: Independent Television, as a result of Paxson Communications' financial troubles.

== Technical information ==
=== Subchannels ===
The station's signal is multiplexed:

Subchannels of KPXC-TV
Channel	Res.	Short name	Programming
59.1	720p	ION	Ion Television
59.2	720p	Bounce	Bounce TV
59.3	480i	CourtTV	Court TV
59.4	480i	IONPlus	Ion Plus
59.5	480i	BUSTED	Busted
59.6	480i	Defy	Defy
59.7	480i	GameSho	Game Show Central
59.8	480i	MeTOONS	MeTV Toons

=== Analog-to-digital conversion ===
KPXC-TV shut down its analog signal, over UHF channel 59, on June 12, 2009, the official date on which full-power television stations in the United States transitioned from analog to digital broadcasts under federal mandate. The station's digital signal remained on its pre-transition UHF channel 43, using virtual channel 59.
