= KSBS-CD =

Television station in Denver

Translator of KCDO-TV, Sterling, Colorado
- Denver, Colorado; United States
- Channels: Digital: 19 (UHF); Virtual: 10
- Branding: The Spot Denver 3

Programming
- Affiliations: 3.1: Independent / ABC (alternate); 7.1: ABC; 10.1: Laff; for others, see § Subchannels

Ownership
- Owner: E. W. Scripps Company; (Scripps Broadcasting Holdings LLC)

History
- Former call signs: K13OI (1982–1996); K18FI (1996–1998); KSBS-LP (1998–2007); KSBS-LD (2007–2013)
- Former channel numbers: Digital: 52 (UHF, 2010–2012), 41 (UHF, 2012–2019)
- Former affiliations: 10.1: Light TV/The Grio (until 2024)
- Call sign meaning: Formerly relayed KSBS-TV in Steamboat Springs

Technical information
- Licensing authority: FCC
- Facility ID: 168750
- Class: CD
- ERP: 13.8 kW
- HAAT: 231.1 m (758 ft)
- Transmitter coordinates: 39°43′45.9″N 105°14′9.9″W

Links
- Public license information: Public file; LMS

KSBS-CD (channel 10) is a low-power, Class A television station in Denver, Colorado, United States. It is a translator of Sterling-licensed independent station KCDO-TV (channel 3) which is owned by the E. W. Scripps Company; it is also sister to ABC affiliate KMGH-TV (channel 7). KSBS-CD's transmitter is located atop Lookout Mountain, near Golden; its parent station shares studios with KMGH-TV on Delgany Street in Denver's River North Art District.

== History ==
The license history begins with the establishment of K13OI in Estes Park Estates, which was a translator for NBC affiliate KUSA-TV. The station was acquired by GreenTV Corporation, which owned KSBS-TV in Steamboat Springs, in 1995, and moved to channel 18 in Denver as K18FI; it later shifted to channel 67 and later 47, as KSBS-LP, one of two low-power stations bringing Telemundo to Denver.

In 2006, NBC Universal, which had acquired KSBS-TV and KSBS-LP in 2001, bought KDEN-TV in Longmont and relocated Telemundo there; it then donated KSBS-TV to Rocky Mountain PBS and sold KSBS-LP, which was by then a Class A station, to Denver Digital Television. Under Denver Digital ownership, KSBS-LP received a $23,000 fine for omissions in its public file in 2013. Denver Digital sold KSBS to KCDO-TV in 2014, at which time it became a simulcast to bring KCDO's signal into the Denver metropolitan area.

On September 22, 2020, the E. W. Scripps Company announced it was buying KSBS-CD and KCDO-TV for an undisclosed price, pending approval of the Federal Communications Commission (FCC); this would make them sister stations to KMGH-TV. The sale was completed on November 20.

== Subchannels ==
This station rebroadcasts the subchannels of KCDO-TV.

Subchannels of KCDO-TV
Channel	Res.	Short name	Programming
3.1	720p	Local3	Main KCDO-TV programming
3.2	480i	Grit SD	Grit
7.1	720p	KMGH-TV	ABC (KMGH-TV)
10.1	480i	Laff	Laff
10.2	480i	Ion	Ion
10.3	480i	QVC	QVC

Simulcast of subchannels of another station

== See also ==
- KCDO-TV
