= My 20 =

My 20 may refer to:

- KTXH Houston, Texas (O&O)
- WDCA Washington, D.C. (O&O)
- KTVD Denver, Colorado
- WMYD Detroit, Michigan (2006-2021)
