= Sardella =

Sardella (also Latin for "sardine") is a surname. Notable people with the surname include:

- Ed Sardella, American reporter
- Federico Sardella (born 1988), Argentine footballer
- Ferdinando Sardella (born 1960), Swedish academic in the history of religion
- Killian Sardella (born 2002), Belgian footballer

== See also ==
- Engraulicypris sardella, a species of fish
