= KDEN =

KDEN may refer to:

- KDEN-TV, a television station (channel 29) licensed to serve Longmont, Colorado, United States
- Denver International Airport (ICAO code KDEN)
- Stapleton International Airport, the former Denver International Airport also had as ICAO code KDEN
