= Stormy Rottman =

Leon Morris "Stormy" Rottman
- Born: March 12, 1918; Chicago, Illinois
- Died: January 15, 1993 (aged 74); Denver, Colorado
- Occupation: Television meteorologist
- Years active: 1950s – 1988

Leon "Stormy" Rottman (1918 - January 15, 1993) was an American weather forecaster and television host. After his experience with reporting weather conditions for the U.S. Air Force during World War II and the Korean War, Rottman began a civilian career as a weather presenter on both television and radio. He was the primary evening weatherman for many years at Channel 9 in Denver, Colorado.

== Beginnings and military service ==
Leon Rottman was born in 1918 in Chicago, Illinois. After enlisting in the U.S. Air Force, he was stationed in Kunming, China as a briefing officer. It was here that Rottman began forecasting weather conditions in the area, gaining the nickname "Stormy" that he would keep for the remainder of his career. During the Korean War, Rottman was stationed at Chennault Air Force Base in Lake Charles, Louisiana. While still a forecaster for the Air Force, Rottman also worked part-time at a local television station in the vicinity.

In the mid-1950s, Rottman could be heard presenting weather conditions and forecasts on Armed Forces Radio in Tokyo, Japan. He was transferred to the North American Aerospace Defense Command (NORAD) at the Cheyenne Mountain Complex, near Colorado Springs, Colorado in 1957. In addition to serving as weatherman for Baker Crew at NORAD, Rottman also worked as a part-time forecaster for KRDO-TV, Channel 13 in Colorado Springs. He had another stint with Armed Forces Radio in the early 1960s, this time based in Germany.

== Full-time television career ==
After his assignment in Germany had ended, Rottman retired from the Air Force as a lieutenant colonel in 1968. He then pursued a career as a weather forecaster, working at various radio and television stations across the United States throughout the 1960s.

In 1969, Rottman began working for KBTV (now KUSA) in Denver, Colorado, where he remained for almost 20 years. For much of his stay at Channel 9, Rottman was the "Chief Meteorologist", generally delivering the primary weather segments during the 5PM and 10PM weekday newscasts. His quirky nickname and style of presenting weather forecasts made him a well-known local personality. When Channel 9 hired Rob Roseman as a daytime meteorologist in the 1980s, the station dubbed Roseman "Sunny" and created an advertising campaign featuring the two men with the tagline, "Sunny days and Stormy nights". Rottman continued working at KUSA until his retirement at age 70 in 1988.

== Other work and death ==
While in Denver, Rottman also became the host of Senior Showcase, a program focusing on issues relevant to elderly Coloradans. This show aired on KRMA, one of two Public Broadcasting Service (PBS) Public television stations serving Denver.

Rottman died January 15, 1993, in Denver.

== Legacy and awards ==
Rottman was awarded a Broadcaster of the Year award by the Colorado Broadcasters Association. In 2003, he was also inducted posthumously into the Broadcast Pioneers of Colorado Hall of Fame. Metropolitan State University of Denver (formerly Metropolitan State College of Denver) awards a Stormy Rottman Endowed Memorial Scholarship annually to a student majoring in meteorology.
