= KTVD =

Television station in Denver

- Denver, Colorado; United States
- Channels: Digital: 31 (UHF); Virtual: 20
- Branding: KTVD 20

Programming
- Affiliations: 20.1: Independent with MyNetworkTV; 9.4: NBC; for others, see § Subchannels

Ownership
- Owner: Tegna Inc., a subsidiary of Nexstar Media Group (sale pending to an unknown third party); (Multimedia Holdings Corporation)
- Sister stations: KUSA; Nexstar: KWGN-TV, KDVR

History
- First air date: December 1, 1988
- Former channel numbers: Analog: 20 (UHF, 1988–2009); Digital: 19 (UHF, 2008–2019)
- Former affiliations: Independent (1988–1995); UPN (1995–2006)
- Call sign meaning: "Television Denver"

Technical information
- Licensing authority: FCC
- Facility ID: 68581
- ERP: 960 kW
- HAAT: 374 m (1,227 ft)
- Transmitter coordinates: 39°43′50.6″N 105°13′55.6″W
- Translator(s): see § Translators

Links
- Public license information: Public file; LMS
- Website: www.my20denver.com

KTVD (channel 20) is a television station in Denver, Colorado, United States. It is programmed primarily as an independent station, but maintains a secondary affiliation with MyNetworkTV. KTVD is owned by the Tegna subsidiary of Nexstar Media Group alongside NBC affiliate KUSA (channel 9); Nexstar also owns CW station KWGN-TV (channel 2) and Fox affiliate KDVR (channel 31). KTVD and KUSA share studios on East Speer Boulevard in Denver's Speer neighborhood; KTVD's transmitter is located atop Lookout Mountain (near Golden).

KTVD began broadcasting as Denver's third major independent station on December 1, 1988. Its initial owner, Twenver Inc., sank under the weight of a weak local advertising market and expensive programming purchases and filed for bankruptcy reorganization within two years of launching the station; Twenver's financial issues caused the station's primary programming attraction, Denver Nuggets basketball, to break ties. In 1993, the station was acquired out of bankruptcy by the Chicago-based Newsweb Corporation, which focused the station on entertainment and sports programming with the new UPN network and broadcasts of the Nuggets, Colorado Avalanche, and Colorado Rockies.

The station was acquired by Gannett—the predecessor to Tegna—in 2006. KTVD's operations were consolidated with KUSA, and it added morning and evening newscasts to expand that station's market-leading news presence. As a consequence of being bypassed in the merger of UPN and The WB into The CW, the station affiliated with MyNetworkTV. KTVD is the primary preseason broadcaster of Denver Broncos football and airs 20 Nuggets and Avalanche games per year. In 2026, as part of the merger of Tegna and Nexstar, Nexstar committed to divesting KTVD within two years.

== History ==
Channel 20 had been among the earliest television channel assignments to Denver, and two unsuccessful attempts to activate it preceded KTVD. In 1952, the Mountain States Television Company filed for the channel; while the application was pending at the Federal Communications Commission (FCC), theatrical producer and major stakeholder Irving Jacobs died of a heart attack. The permit was awarded on September 18, 1952, after which time Irving's wife Anne also died. The remaining owners—the Sigman family, the brothers of Anne Jacobs—held off on construction in hopes that a national network could form and extend affiliation to the proposed KIRV. Ultimately, Mountain States surrendered the permit in December 1953. The second permit was granted to publishing firm Harcourt, Brace & World in 1966. Harcourt, which had filed for three UHF stations in western states, later sold the permit to The Denver Post.

New interest bubbled around channel 20 beginning in the late 1970s. In 1977, Denver-based American Television & Communications—the pay-television division of Time, Inc.—applied for the channel as a hybrid commercial and subscription television station. A firm headed by John H. Gayer, originally known as Family Television Inc. but later as Colorado Television Inc., applied in 1978, specifying a lineup of religious and family-oriented secular programming. The FCC took these two applications as well as those of Alden Communications of Colorado and Oak Television of Denver and designated them for comparative hearing in October 1980. American Television & Communications had withdrawn by August 1983, when FCC administrative law judge Frederic J. Coufal ruled in favor of Alden's application. He disqualified Colorado Television, finding it lacked access to a suitable transmitter site, and selected Alden over Oak owing to diversification of media ownership policy. A principal reason for the Colorado Television disqualification was the withdrawal by KWGN-TV (channel 2) of permission to set up its transmitter facility at that station's site on Lookout Mountain.

=== Twenver ownership ===
Alden Communications of Colorado sold the channel 20 permit—still unbuilt and then bearing the call sign KTZO-TV—to Twenver, Inc., headed by N. Richard Miller, in January 1988. After the sale to Twenver, activity accelerated. In August, the station—now KTVD—reached a five-year deal with the Denver Nuggets basketball team to air 30 road games a season. The KTVD–Nuggets contract was part of a major shakeup of the club's television rights. They abandoned their longtime broadcaster, KWGN-TV, for a split arrangement between KTVD and KMGH-TV (channel 7), which took on 10 road games; signed a deal with Prime Sports Network, a new regional sports network, for 25 home games on cable; and assumed production duties for all telecasts.

After setbacks in construction caused channel 20 to miss airing some of the first Nuggets games in its new deal, KTVD began broadcasting on December 1, 1988. The Nuggets were the anchor of a lineup that included syndicated sitcoms, classic movies, and wrestling. KTVD's backers believed Denver—the 19th-largest television market at the time—could, like other similarly sized markets, support three competing independent TV stations. Its main competitors, KWGN-TV and KDVR, captured less audience share than the three independents in comparable cities. (Note: Though KDVR had been a Fox affiliate since 1986, Fox affiliates continued to be considered independent stations for a number of years after Fox launched, particularly as Fox did not program a full seven-night schedule early on. The Fox owned-and-operated stations did not leave the trade association for independent stations, INTV, until 1992.)

KTVD's debut into the marketplace came at a time when the Denver economy had flatlined. In 1987 and 1988, television ad revenues had posted year-over-year declines, with only minimal increases projected for the years to come. Also during this time, the Nuggets were sold to Bertram Lee and Peter Bynoe; former owner Sidney Shlenker retained the Nuggets' ownership stake in KTVD. Unlike Shlenker, who believed increased television revenue would make up for any shortfalls in attendance, the new Nuggets ownership believed it was overexposed on television, with 67 of 82 games aired in the 1989–90 season, depressing gate revenue.

By April 1990, the station was facing financial difficulties. When Prime Sports Network told its affiliates—in error—that it would carry two late-season road games in light of the station closing, it brought to the fore a payment dispute between KTVD and the Nuggets and the station's financial struggles; the station had lost $7.5 million in 1989 on $6.2 million in gross revenue. That May, Twenver agreed to sell a majority stake in KTVD to Pennsylvania BancShares, Inc., an investment company, but BancShares did not want to advance any funding to Twenver until the FCC approved the transaction amid other disputes. This proved to be a major problem. On June 7, 1990, Chrysler Capital Corporation—a secured creditor—declared Twenver in default on its loan and drew a $1 million line of credit. On top of the station's existing issues with cash flow problems and a large outlay on syndicated programming, this forced Twenver to file for Chapter 11 bankruptcy reorganization on July 11, 1990. Nine of the top twenty creditors were program distributors. Two days later, the Nuggets—owed nearly $1 million—and KTVD terminated their agreement, and before the end of the month, general manager Jack Moffitt was fired as a cost-saving move. During this time, in November 1990, channel 20 rented three hours of prime time on Election Day to KCNC-TV in a first-of-its-kind arrangement to present extended election coverage. The station experimented with local comedy; in 1992, it aired the series Denver Friday Night, similar in format to Saturday Night Live.

=== Newsweb ownership and UPN affiliation ===
KTVD remained in bankruptcy for more than three years until the Chicago-based Newsweb Corporation acquired KTVD and paid $7.5 million to creditors, who received 25 cents on the dollar. Newsweb owned the Chicago market's WPWR-TV, a similarly situated independent with similar programming. Newsweb held the construction permit for channel 14 in Boulder, which it sold to Roberts Broadcasting in order to acquire channel 20. Newsweb programmed the station with talk shows in prime time as a strategy to mitigate the impact of its relatively meager syndicated inventory, particularly compared to KWGN and KDVR, but an upturn in the Colorado economy increased advertising revenue as the station increased its audience share.

In 1995, KTVD debuted two new program packages. One was a network affiliation as UPN started up with channel 20 as its Denver affiliate. The other was the Colorado Avalanche, Denver's new NHL team. In the Avs' first season, KTVD aired 19 games. The Avs, who made the playoffs in their first season, were credited with immediately boosting channel 20's image; general manager Terry Brown noted that KTVD had better ratings in the team's first season than KTXA did in the first season of Dallas Stars hockey. Though the team switched to a six-game over-the-air package with KMGH in 1996–97, KTVD aired playoff road games; it returned to broadcasting Avs regular-season games in 1997–98.

Owner Ascent Sports packaged Avs and Nuggets games with KPXC-TV (channel 59) for the 1998–99 season, but after one season, the package moved to KTVD. The station also experimented with local program production, including a documentary series and a weekly talk show hosted by Denver Broncos players Ed McCaffrey and Rod Smith, as well as high school football telecasts. All rights to the Avalanche and Nuggets moved to Altitude Sports and Entertainment, a new team-owned regional sports network, in 2004. In 2003, KTVD took over from KWGN-TV as the over-the-air broadcaster of the Colorado Rockies, with 75 baseball games a year; Rockies games remained on channel 20 through the 2008 season, by which time telecasts had been restricted to Sunday afternoons.

Newsweb acquired KTVS (channel 3) in Sterling, Colorado, some 120 miles (190 km) north of Denver, from Benedek Broadcasting in 1999. The station switched to rebroadcasting KTVD.

=== Duopoly with KUSA ===
On December 15, 2005, Newsweb announced it would sell KTVD to Gannett, owner of Denver's NBC affiliate, KUSA (channel 9). This would form the second duopoly within Gannett, after the First Coast News stations in Jacksonville, Florida. The agreement required adjustment when, amid final negotiations, UPN announced its merger with The WB into The CW. That network would affiliate with KWGN-TV, which had been the WB affiliate. The deal received FCC approval in June 2006 and was shortly followed by an affiliation agreement with MyNetworkTV to replace the closing UPN. Few employees moved with KTVD from its offices in Englewood to KUSA. Newsweb retained KUPN, the former KTVS, in the deal.

KTVD, along with KUSA and several other Denver stations, was among the last major-market TV stations to provide high-power digital television. The reason related to myriad siting, permitting, and other challenges that impeded construction of a new digital TV tower on Lookout Mountain for the "Lake Cedar Group" (KCNC, KMGH, KUSA, KTVD) until an act of Congress broke the impasse. KTVD provided high-power digital service before KUSA, by July 2008, and both stations ceased analog broadcasting on April 16, 2009.

Gannett split in two on June 29, 2015, with one side specializing in print media and the other side specializing in broadcast and digital media. KUSA and KTVD were retained by the latter company, named Tegna.

On August 19, 2025, Nexstar Media Group agreed to acquire Tegna for $6.2 billion. In Denver, Nexstar already owned KDVR and KWGN-TV. The deal was approved and completed on March 19, 2026. As part of the transaction, Nexstar committed to the divestiture of KTVD within two years, along with five other stations in markets where the two companies combined held four TV station licenses.

== Programming ==
=== Newscasts ===
Within months of Gannett's acquisition, KTVD began airing local news. On September 5, 2006, coinciding with the launch of MyNetworkTV, KTVD debuted a half-hour 9 p.m. newscast from KUSA; three months later, the station added a weekday morning newscast extension from 7 to 9 a.m. The 9 p.m. newscast was expanded to a full hour in 2010.

=== Sports programming ===
With KUSA, KTVD shares rights to the preseason games of the Denver Broncos of the NFL. In some years—such as 2014, 2015, 2016, and 2023—KTVD carried the entire preseason schedule, then comprising four games. In 2024, of three preseason games, one was a national telecast, and the other two were split by KTVD and KUSA.

Beginning with the 2024–25 NBA season and the 2024–25 NHL season, KTVD reached an agreement with Altitude Sports and Entertainment to simulcast 20 Denver Nuggets games and 20 Colorado Avalanche games. Ten games were also simulcast on KUSA. Altitude had previously distributed two nights of the 2019–20 Nuggets season and two nights of the 2019–20 Avalanche season in light of a near-total blackout of Altitude by pay television providers that caused ratings for the channel to drop by more than 70 percent. KTVD agreed to simulcast ten Colorado Rockies games produced by MLB Local Media in the 2025 MLB season, with five of those scheduled for simulcast on KUSA.

== Technical information ==
=== Subchannels ===
KTVD's transmitter is located atop Lookout Mountain (near Golden). The station's signal is multiplexed:

Subchannels of KTVD
| Subchannel | Res. | Short name | Programming |
|---|---|---|---|
| 20.1 | 720p | KTVD-HD | Main KTVD programming |
| 20.2 | 480i | H & I | Heroes & Icons |
| 20.3 | 480i | ShopLC | Shop LC |
| 20.4 | 480i | | Quest → Outlaw (soon) |
| 9.4 | 1080i | KUSA-HD | NBC (KUSA) |
| 9.7 | 480i | TBD | (Blank) |

Simulcast of subchannels of another station

=== Translators ===
KTVD is broadcast by translator systems in parts of Colorado. Note that most transmitters listed only broadcast the main subchannel of KTVD, typically on the same transmitter as the main channel of other stations.

- Anton: K16NJ-D (20.1 and 20.2)
  - Wray: K14SA-D
- Holyoke: K23OX-D (20.1 and 20.2)
  - Idalia: K24EZ-D
  - Pleasant Valley: K28IX-D
- Jacks Cabin: K24KR-D (20.1 only)
- Wray: K16NH-D (full multiplex)
