= Anne Trujillo =

Anne Trujillo is a broadcast news anchor at Denver 7 (KMGH-TV).

Trujillo currently anchors Denver7 News at 5:00, 6:00 and 10:00 Monday through Friday.

Trujillo started working at KMGH as a general assignment reporter. She graduated from the University of Colorado Boulder with a B.S. in Journalism. She was named Best Anchor by Westword Magazine in 2006. Anne was also named to the Silver Circle of National Academy of Television Arts and Sciences (NATAS).

As of September 15, 2009, Trujillo was currently the longest tenured TV news anchor in Denver. She has been with KMGH for over 25 years and will retire after 39 years at Denver 7 in November 2023.
