= KMHC =

Television station in Steamboat Springs, Colorado

- Steamboat Springs, Colorado; United States
- Channels: Digital: 10 (VHF); Virtual: 24

Programming
- Affiliations: 10.1: Outside TV

Ownership
- Owner: Syncom Media Group, Inc.

History
- First air date: December 1987
- Former call signs: KSBS-TV (1987–2000); KMAS-TV (2000–2007); KRMZ (2007–2026)
- Former channel numbers: Analog: 24 (UHF, 1987–2009)
- Former affiliations: Independent (1987–1995); Telemundo (1995–2006); Dark (2006−2007); PBS (2007–2026)

Technical information
- Licensing authority: FCC
- Facility ID: 20373
- ERP: 0.481 kW
- HAAT: 175.2 m (575 ft)
- Transmitter coordinates: 40°27′43″N 106°51′0″W

Links
- Public license information: Public file; LMS

KMHC (channel 24) is a television station in Steamboat Springs, Colorado, United States. Owned by Syncom Media Group, it carries programming from Outside TV, an outdoor lifestyle oriented network. KMHC's transmitter is located atop Quarry Mountain west of Steamboat Springs.

The station went on the air in 1987 as KSBS-TV, an independent station based in Steamboat Springs. From 1995 to 2006, it was a Telemundo affiliate which was seen in Denver on two low-power translators. After the station–renamed KMAS-TV in 2000–was replaced in the network by KDEN-TV in 2006, it was donated to Rocky Mountain PBS in 2007 and served as its Steamboat Springs transmitter, KRMZ, until 2026. Syncom Media Group then acquired the station and renamed it KMHC.

== History ==
=== Early years ===
On May 5, 1986, the Federal Communications Commission (FCC) granted a construction permit to Constance J. Wodlinger for a new television station on channel 24 in Steamboat Springs, Colorado. Wodlinger owned radio stations in the Kansas City market. Channel 24 began broadcasting as an independent television station in the second half of December 1987, as KSBS-TV; Wodlinger was joined by several other investors in Steamboat Broadcast System, Inc., which owned the station, including president Thomas Greer. Local programming on channel 24 at launch included Steamboat Breakfast Club, a daily morning show with news and features; a daily news program; and telecourses from Colorado Mountain College. The station filled out its broadcast day with programs from the Satellite Program Network and music videos from Wodlinger-owned Hit Video USA. Greer, who had previously produced a program called Ski TV which aired on ESPN, had plans to start similar stations in other Colorado ski cities. The station sold itself to advertisers seeking to reach ski visitors, noting that it was the only television signal carried in some of the town's hotels.

KSBS-TV was sold in 1991 to Frederick I. Shaffer III for $250,000. Under Shaffer, KSBS-TV primarily broadcast tourist information programming and content from the Resort Sports Network.

=== Going Telemundo ===
Another sale came in March 1995 to GreenTV Corporation, headed by David Drucker. Drucker's purchase marked the first connection between KSBS-TV and a Denver station, since he owned KUBD, Denver's Telemundo affiliate. However, Drucker and his partner in Denver, Charlie Ergen, sold KUBD two months later to Paxson Communications Corporation. Paxson immediately switched that station to the same Infomall TV infomercial programming used on its other stations.

Telemundo moved from KUBD to KSBS-TV, which appeared on two translators in Denver—KMAS-LP (channel 63) and KSBS-LP (channel 18)—and also began a fight to get onto important cable systems in Denver for the first time using must-carry rules. In 1997, TCI added KSBS to its Denver area cable systems, replacing Galavisión.

We always knew that large-scale Spanish broadcast is where we wanted to go, but the success of our Denver pilot was critical to get to the next step.

— Steve Hillard, chief executive of Council Tree Communications, on buying a stake in Telemundo

In 2000, KSBS-TV was purchased by Council Tree Communications of Longmont, in which one of the investors was an Alaska Native–owned corporation; the new owners changed the call letters to KMAS-TV for más, the Spanish word for "more". Council Tree then deepened its involvement with Telemundo by making a $181 million investment in exchange for a 17 percent stake in the network—which still was a controlling stake because of ownership restrictions; the transaction also made KMAS-TV a network owned-and-operated station. KMAS-TV then was sold along with the network to NBC in October 2001.

=== From Telemundo to PBS ===
In 2006, Longmont Broadcasting sold its television station in that city, KDEN-TV (channel 25), to NBC, and Telemundo moved there from KMAS-TV and its two translators on March 6, a switch giving Telemundo signal parity with other Denver TV stations. It was the third station purchase made by Telemundo in a year, after its purchase of KBLR-TV in Las Vegas and a license swap that gave Telemundo a full-power signal in Phoenix.

The Steamboat Springs station was now surplus to NBC's needs, and it was taken dark. The chief engineer of KMAS-TV, a former Rocky Mountain PBS employee, suggested that the company donate the station to the public broadcaster. After several visits to the site and the repair of the transmitter, the station returned to the air in October 2007 as KRMZ, the fifth full-service transmitter in the Rocky Mountain PBS network.

=== Sale to Syncom Media Group ===
In January 2026, Rocky Mountain Public Media filed to sell KRMZ for $200,000 to Atlanta-based Syncom Media Group, which owned four low-power TV stations in Denver. The application provided for a change in the station's call sign and an application to return the station to commercial status before closing. The FCC granted the assignment on March 9, 2026, and the call sign was changed to KMHC on June 1.

== Technical information ==
=== Subchannel ===
Subchannel of KMHC
Subchannel	Res.	Short name	Programming
24.1	1080i	KRMZ-DT	Outside TV

=== Analog-to-digital conversion ===
KMHC (as KRMZ) shut down its analog signal, over UHF channel 24, on February 17, 2009, the original date on which full-power television stations in the United States were to transition from analog to digital broadcasts under federal mandate (which was later pushed back to June 12, 2009). The station's digital signal remained on its pre-transition VHF channel 10, using virtual channel 24.
