= Outside TV =

American sports TV channel

Ownership
- Owner: Outside

History
- Launched: 1994

Links
- Website: outsidetv.com

Availability

Terrestrial
- Digital terrestrial television: Channel 28.1 (Denver, Colorado)

Streaming media
- Sling TV: Internet Protocol television
- Fubo TV: Internet Protocol television
- Samsung TV Plus: 1178
- Xumo: 129
- Roku: 233

Outside TV (formerly RSN Television) is a sports-oriented cable and satellite television network based on Outside magazine. The network features programming related to various outdoor activities and the lives of those who engage in them.

== History ==
Outside TV emerged from a comprehensive rebranding initiative of the pre-existing Resort Sports Network, a national television network specializing in the creation and distribution of outdoor-lifestyle content tailored for prime vacation destinations across the country. As of June 2010, Outside TV was in 110 resort markets, representing 61 million potential viewers.

Outside TV has a corporate office in Westport, Connecticut, and a main office in Portland, Maine. Its sales office is located in the Graybar Building at 420 Lexington in New York City.

Outside TV was founded by publisher Lawrence Burke and founding executive producer and executive vice president Les Guthman in 1994. Over the next ten years, it produced the Outside Television Presents TV series, whose production Farther Than the Eye Can See, captured blind climber Erick Weihenmayer's historic ascension to the summit of Mount Everest. Into the Tsangpo Gorge, produced by director and expedition leader Scott Lindgren, achieved the first white water descent of the 18,000-ft.-deep Tsangpo Gorge (Yarlung Tsangpo Grand Canyon) in Tibet. Into the Tsangpo Gorge aired on NBC Sports in May 2002 and was Outside Magazine's cover story in July 2002.

In July 2013, Outside TV entered into a new multi-year distribution agreement with the National Cable Television Cooperative (NCTC), representing more than 950 different cable providers and thousands of local systems nationwide. The addition of NCTC to Outside Television's other core distribution partners such as Comcast Xfinity makes the independent network available to more than 40 million homes.

In 2021 Lawrence "Larry" Burke sold Outside TV to Robin Thurston who chose to rename the company Outside.

== See also ==
=== Similar networks ===
- Outdoor Channel
- Sportsman Channel
- NBC Sports Outdoors (segment on NBCSN)
- MyOutdoorTV.com
