= KMGH-TV =

Television station in Denver

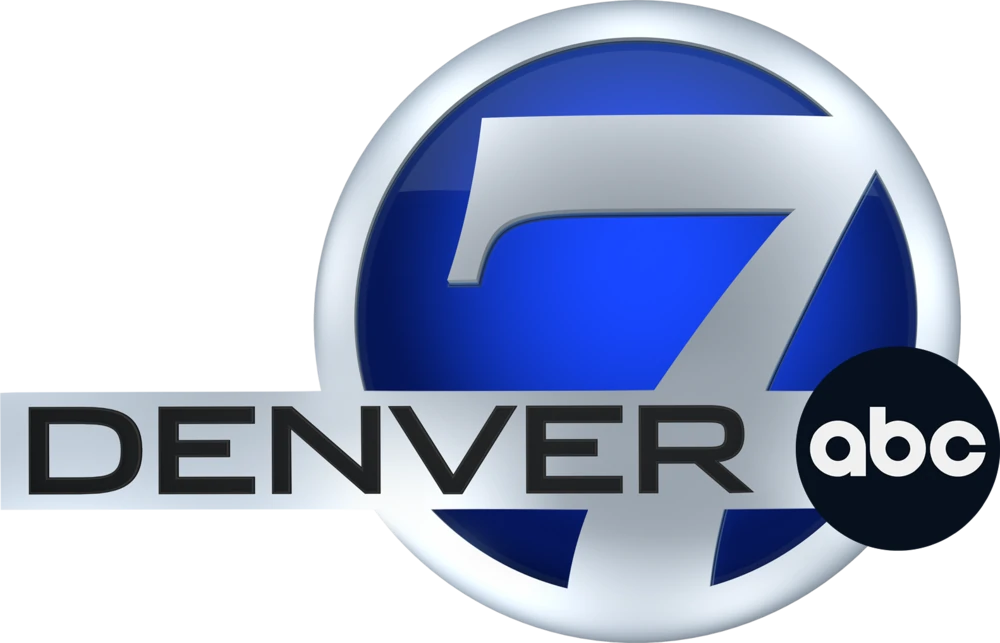
- Denver, Colorado; United States
- Channels: Digital: 7 (VHF); Virtual: 7
- Branding: Denver 7

Programming
- Affiliations: 7.1: ABC; 7.2: Ion Mystery; 7.3: Laff

Ownership
- Owner: E. W. Scripps Company; (Scripps Broadcasting Holdings LLC)
- Sister stations: KCDO-TV, KSBS-CD, KOAA-TV

History
- First air date: November 1, 1953
- Former call signs: KLZ-TV (1953–1972)
- Former channel numbers: Analog: 7 (VHF, 1953–2009); Digital: 17 (UHF, 1999–2009)
- Former affiliations: CBS (1953–1995)
- Call sign meaning: "McGraw-Hill" (former owner of station)

Technical information
- Licensing authority: FCC
- Facility ID: 40875
- ERP: 54 kW
- HAAT: 359 m (1,178 ft)
- Transmitter coordinates: 39°43′50.6″N 105°13′55.6″W
- Translator(s): see § Translators

Links
- Public license information: Public file; LMS
- Website: www.denver7.com

KMGH-TV (channel 7) is a television station in Denver, Colorado, United States, affiliated with ABC. It is owned by the E. W. Scripps Company alongside Sterling-licensed KCDO-TV (channel 3), an independent station (and its Denver-based translator KSBS-CD, channel 10). The two stations share studios on Delgany Street in Denver's River North Art District; KMGH-TV's transmitter is located atop Lookout Mountain, near Golden.

KMGH-TV operates digital translator KZFC-LD (channel 26) in Windsor, and its main channel is relayed on a digital subchannel of KSBS-CD, allowing homes with issues receiving KMGH's VHF signal or only a UHF antenna to receive KMGH-TV in some form; KCDO-TV also carries a 7.1 subchannel to extend KMGH-TV's over-the-air reach throughout northeast Colorado and western Nebraska. The station's second and third subchannels, which carry Scripps-owned diginets Ion Mystery and Laff, are relayed on translators KZCO-LD (channel 30) in Denver and KZCS-LD (channel 18) in Colorado Springs.

== History ==
=== As a CBS affiliate ===
Channel 7 first signed on the air on November 1, 1953, as KLZ-TV. It was founded by the Oklahoma City-based Oklahoma Publishing Company (operated by Edward K. Gaylord), which also owned KLZ radio (560 AM and 106.7 FM, now KWBL).

KLZ-TV immediately took the CBS affiliation from KBTV (channel 9, now KUSA), owing to KLZ radio's longtime affiliation with the CBS Radio Network.

In 1954, Gaylord sold the KLZ television and radio stations to Time Inc., who later subordinated their acquisition under its in 1961 established subsidiary Time-Life, Inc. as Time–Life Broadcasting, Inc.

The station's original studio facilities were housed in a renovated former auto dealership on the east side of the block at East 6th Avenue and Sherman Street. Channel 7 moved to an eight-sided, five-story building called "The Communications Center", on the intersection of Speer Boulevard and Lincoln Street in 1969.

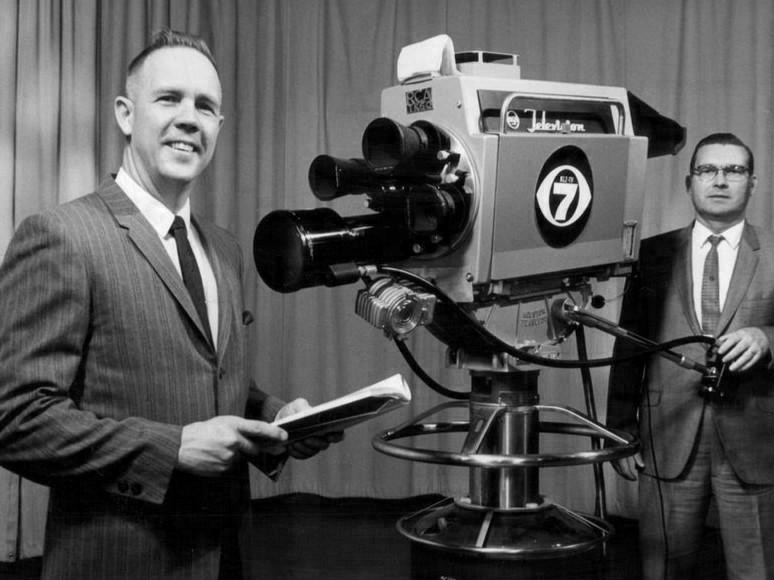
The taping of a religious public affairs program at the station in 1968

Time-Life sold the station on channel 7 to McGraw-Hill in late October 1970, in a group deal that also involved the company's other radio and television combinations in Indianapolis, San Diego, and Grand Rapids; and KERO-TV (channel 23) in Bakersfield, California. In order to comply with the Federal Communications Commission's new restrictions on concentration of media ownership that went into effect shortly afterward, McGraw-Hill was required to sell the KLZ radio stations as well as their sister radio properties in Indianapolis, San Diego, and Grand Rapids to other companies. Time-Life would later purchase WOTV (channel 8, now WOOD-TV) in Grand Rapids in the final deal. By the time the sale was finalized in June 1972, the purchase price for the entire group was just over $57 million. WFBM-TV (channel 6, now WRTV) in Indianapolis, KERO-TV in Bakersfield, and KOGO-TV (channel 10, now KGTV) in San Diego were retained by McGraw-Hill, along with KLZ-TV, which subsequently changed its call letters to KMGH-TV on the 1st (with the calls reflecting the new ownership), in order to comply with a now-repealed FCC rule in place then that forbade TV and radio stations in the same market, but with different ownership from sharing the same callsigns.

The 1990s did not begin well for KMGH; the station saw significant overall financial losses in 1990 and 1991, as well as a decrease in viewership for its local newscasts. A new management team introduced in 1991 turned things around at KMGH; net profit soared 105.5% in 1992 as a result.

=== ABC affiliation ===
Although KMGH had been one of CBS' stronger affiliates, the station would end up disaffiliating from the network due to a series of events that were set in motion as a result of CBS' partnership with the Westinghouse Electric Corporation in July 1994 (and the network's eventual merger with that company in August 1995). As part of the deal, the network moved its programming from its owned-and-operated station in Philadelphia, WCAU-TV (channel 10), to Westinghouse's KYW-TV (channel 3). In a complex ownership deal that was announced in November 1994, CBS traded WCAU to NBC in exchange for two of that network's O&Os (then longtime affiliates)—Denver's KCNC-TV (channel 4) (which had been an O&O since the station's then-owner General Electric purchased NBC in 1986) and Salt Lake City's KUTV (channel 2) (which the network had acquired less than one month earlier). CBS then formed a joint venture with Westinghouse that assumed ownership of KYW-TV, KCNC and KUTV, with Westinghouse serving as majority owner. Group W/CBS and NBC also swapped the transmitter facilities—and by association, channel frequencies—of their respective stations in Miami, WCIX (now WFOR-TV) and WTVJ.

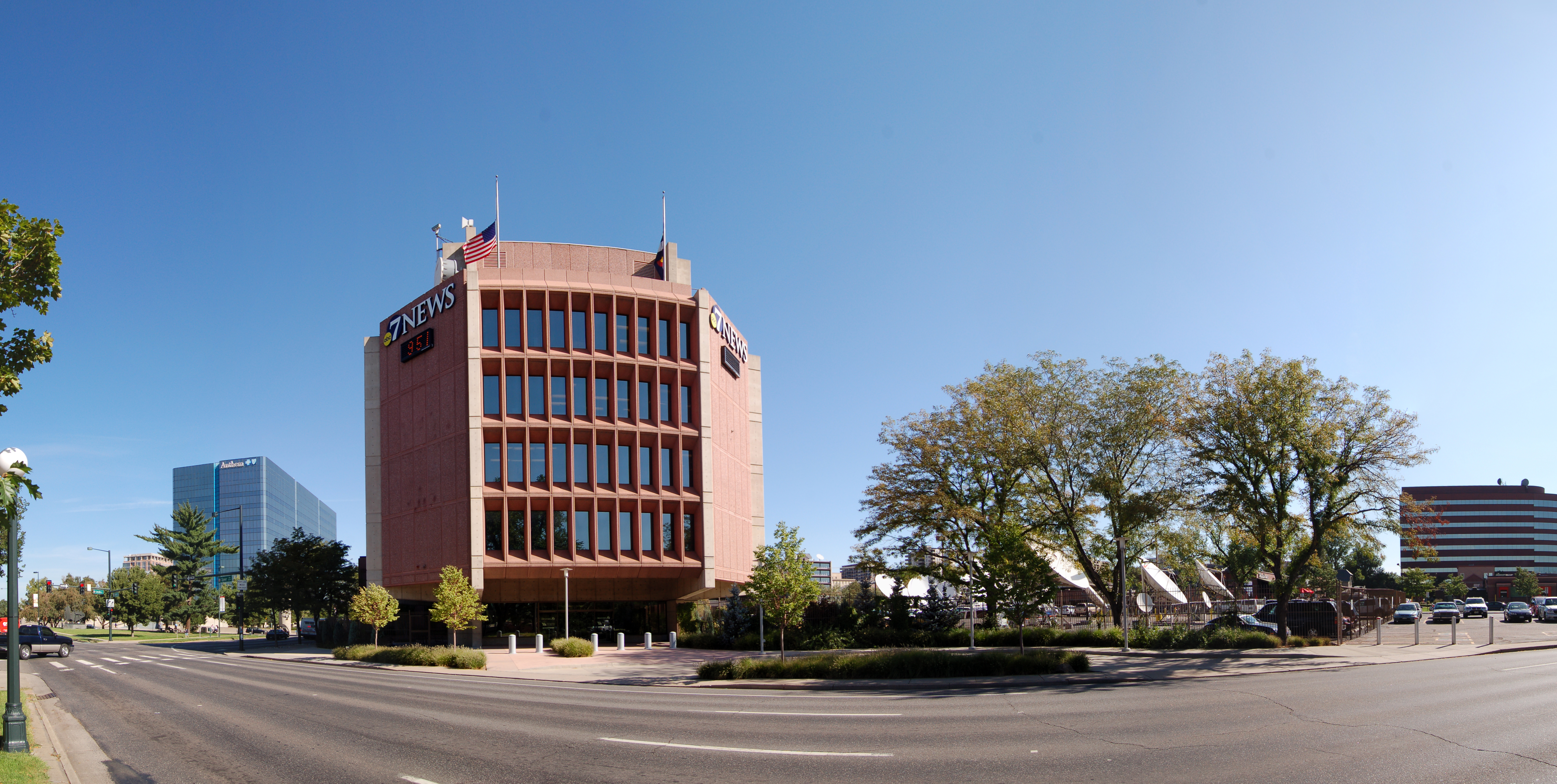
A shot of KMGH-TV's former studios, taken from East Speer Boulevard

At the same time, McGraw-Hill had struck an affiliation agreement with ABC, due partly to the fact that its stations in San Diego and Indianapolis had already been aligned with the network (Bakersfield sister station KERO-TV was also involved in the deal between McGraw-Hill and ABC; however, that station had to wait for its affiliation contract with CBS to expire in March 1996, before it could finally switch to ABC). In keeping with all of this, each of the three major broadcast networks relocated their programming to different stations in the Denver market on September 10, 1995; ABC moved its programming to KMGH from KUSA, with KMGH's outgoing CBS affiliation going to KCNC and NBC moving from KCNC to KUSA. The final CBS program to air on KMGH-TV was a repeat of Walker, Texas Ranger, which began at 9 p.m. the previous day.

On June 14, 2011, McGraw-Hill announced that it would exit from the broadcasting industry and put its entire television station group up for sale; on October 3 of that year, the company announced that it had entered into an agreement to sell the eight-station broadcasting division to the E. W. Scripps Company. The FCC approved the sale on November 29, 2011, and the deal was officially completed on December 30, 2011, resulting in McGraw-Hill's exit from broadcasting after 39 years. The deal marked a re-entry into the Denver market for Scripps; prior to its acquisition of KMGH, the company had owned the Rocky Mountain News from 1926 until the afternoon newspaper ceased publishing in 2009. On May 7, 2019, KMGH dropped Azteca América and replaced it with the Escape network (now Ion Mystery), which moved over from KTFD-TV.

In July 2024, KMGH left its longtime home at The Communications Center on Speer Boulevard for a state-of-the-art facility located near Coors Field.

== Programming ==
KMGH-TV clears the entire ABC network schedule; however, it is one of the few ABC stations that air the Saturday and Sunday editions of ABC World News Tonight a half-hour to one hour earlier than most affiliates due to its hour-long 5 p.m. newscast, and also airs the weekend editions of Good Morning America and This Week one hour earlier (aligning those programs with their recommended airtimes of both programs in the Central Time Zone).

During the 1950s, channel 7's staff included newscaster (later sports anchor and Dialing for Dollars host) Starr Yelland, who came to the station from KOA-TV (channel 4, now KCNC-TV); weatherman Warren Chandler, and Ed Scott, who hosted a children's program on the station as "Sheriff Scotty". In 1956, KLZ-TV presented the first remote television broadcast from a courtroom after general manager Hugh Terry won a court battle to allow cameras into the courtroom.

In 1957, the station's weekly public affairs series Panorama Seven (which was written and hosted by Gene Amole), became the first locally produced program in the Denver market to earn a Peabody Award (channel 7 has since won three more Peabody Awards for the investigative report "Honor and Betrayal: Scandal at the Air Force Academy" in 2003, reported by John Ferrugia and produced by Kurt Silver and current news director Jeff Harris, 2008's "Failing the Children: Deadly Mistakes", reported by Ferrugia and produced by Tom Burke and Arthur Kane, and 2012's "Investigating the Fire") Starting in 1968 and running through 1983, KLZ-TV aired one of the most popular children's programs in the Denver market, the Noell and Andy Show, which aired weekdays at 8 a.m. The program's coloring contest drew hundreds of entries each week.

In 2012, KMGH acquired the broadcast rights to Denver Broncos head coach John Fox's weekly analysis show, The John Fox Show; the station aired the program until the team's 2013 season, losing the rights to KDVR (which renamed the program as Fox on Fox) on August 7, 2014.

The station has also been the recording location for sportswriter Woody Paige's appearances on ESPN's Around the Horn since his 2016 departure from The Denver Post, and the station is credited as such in Paige's chroma key background.

Unlike many ABC affiliates which preempted the network's presentation of Saving Private Ryan, KMGH, along with the other McGraw-Hill stations, aired the film in 2004. KMGH currently airs any Denver Nuggets basketball games selected for broadcast through the NBA on ABC, which included the team's first NBA championship win in their inaugural NBA Finals appearance in 2023.

The station also broadcasts select Colorado Avalanche hockey games through the NHL on ABC and on KJCT News 8 beginning in 2021; this included the team's victory in the 2022 Stanley Cup Final (the network's previous contract, which ran from 1999 to 2004, also included the Avalanche's 2001 Stanley Cup Final victory).

As a CBS affiliate, the station aired the Denver Broncos' appearances on KMGH-TV, in Super Bowls XII, XXI and XXIV.

=== News operation ===
KMGH-TV presently broadcasts 35 hours of locally produced newscasts each week (with 5 1/2 hours on weekdays, 3 1/2 hours on Saturdays and four hours on Sundays). Unlike most stations affiliated with ABC or its competitors, KMGH did not broadcast a local newscast in the 6 p.m. timeslot on weeknights for eight years, opting to fill the hour with episodes of Jeopardy! and Wheel of Fortune (the station's previous 6 p.m. news program was canceled after the May 26, 2006, broadcast). In addition, the station produces the sports highlight program Sports Xtra, which airs Saturdays during the final 15 minutes of the 10 p.m. newscast. As mentioned above, the 6 p.m. newscast was restored on September 8, 2014, due to the move of Jeopardy! and Wheel of Fortune to KDVR; it features an 'express' format with more stories and weather coverage.

While KLZ-TV always had a strong line-up of local and syndicated programs during the station's early years, it was obviously helped by CBS's longtime dominance nationally. The station was the first in Denver to operate a news bureau in Washington, D.C., as well as the first Denver station to receive reports from its own radio and television correspondents in Europe and Asia. Channel 7 televised the first kidney transplant in the mid-1960s. It led the 10 p.m. news ratings from the early 1960s until 1977, when it was displaced from the #1 slot by KBTV, which benefited from ABC's ratings increases in prime time as well as an improved news product that took advantage of live electronic news gathering technology. KMGH-TV was actually the first television station in the market to use ENG equipment in 1975, with its "Insta Cam", which was never promoted on-air. In 1970, Channel 7's newscasts had a 40% ratings share. KOA-TV and KBTV battled for second place, each pulling in about a 24 share for their newscasts. By the end of the decade, KBTV had a 54% ratings share at 10 p.m., more than all of the other stations combined.

The 10 p.m. news team during the 1960s was helmed by news anchor Carl Akers, weatherman Warren Chandler and sports anchor Starr Yelland. All three did live commercials during the program. John Rayburn joined the station as co-anchor of the 10 p.m. newscast in 1964, before departing for KBTV in 1967. In 1966, Akers took a short-lived retirement only to return to Denver television a year later at KBTV as that station's anchor and news director; he was replaced at channel 7 by KOA-TV anchor Bob Palmer. The team of Palmer, Chandler and Yelland continued until 1975, when Terry Phillips was added as a news co-anchor; Phillips was replaced by John Lindsey in 1976. Palmer returned to KOA-TV in 1982. From December 1994 to August 1997, the station operated a weather radar system known as "Doppler Max7", that was heavily promoted during the failed tabloid-formatted "Real Life, Real News" era; this period (from 1996 to 1997) emphasized hard news and investigative reports, but was unable to beat KUSA and KCNC, the former of which had overtaken KMGH for first and the latter for second in most timeslots in the ratings by this point.

On July 15, 2002, KMGH-TV became the first major market television station in the world to broadcast fully automated newscasts. A computer system, known as ParkerVision, combines the work of several technical personnel in a program requiring just a single operator. Ten studio cameras, channels of audio, all art graphics and electronic titling along with tape operations are programmed and played back live by one person instead of seven people. KMGH-TV is the only Denver television station to have won two Alfred I. duPont–Columbia University Awards: the first for the 2003 report, "Honor and Betrayal: Scandal at the Air Force Academy" and the second for the 2010 investigative documentary "33 Minutes to 34 Right".

On August 18, 2008, KMGH became the second television station in the Denver market to begin broadcasting its local newscasts in high definition. In 2011, KMGH was named "Station of the Year" by the Associated Press Television-Radio Association. On May 26, 2011, KMGH moved its hour-long 4 p.m. newscast Seven News Now to 3 p.m. and reduced the program to a half-hour (The Dr. Oz Show moved into the newscast's former timeslot); the program ended after the September 7, 2012, broadcast, in order to accommodate the syndicated talk show Katie.

On June 28, 2013, KMGH entered into a partnership with The Denver Post to collaborate on investigative reports and weather coverage as well as providing additional Spanish-language news content.

On July 14, 2014, KMGH-TV launched a 4 p.m newscast, The Now, which features a mixture of local and national news segments.

==== Sponsored content controversy ====
In 2021, the station's local lifestyle show was tricked into promoting a fake sexual wellness product, "invented" by a team working for late-night political commentary show Last Week Tonight, called the "Venus Veil", which was actually just a blanket; the show's team paid KMGH $2,800 to feature the fake product and an interview with its "creator" as a way to illustrate how stations such as KMGH promote sponsored content. The segment aired on the station's lifestyle program, which is not a newscast, and was disclosed as paid for by the 'client'.

==== Notable current on-air staff ====
- Tony Kovaleski – investigative reporter
- Shannon Ogden – anchor

==== Notable former on-air staff ====
- Ernie Bjorkman – anchor (1982–1984 and 1988–1998)
- Ana Cabrera – anchor/reporter (2009–2013)
- John Ferrugia – investigative reporter/anchor (1992–2016)
- Chris Fowler – sports intern (1986)
- Michael Marsh
- Linda Moulton Howe – director of special projects (1978–1983)
- Bill O'Reilly – reporter
- Harry Smith – reporter/anchor (1982–1985)
- Mark Thompson – weather anchor/environmental reporter
- Liz Walker – weekend anchor/reporter
- Tony Zarrella – sports director (1996–1998)
- Anne Trujillo – anchor

== Technical information ==
=== Subchannels ===
The station's signal is multiplexed:

Subchannels of KMGH-TV
Channel	Res.	Short name	Programming
7.1	720p	KMGH-DT	ABC
7.2	480i	MYS	Ion Mystery
7.3	480i	Laff	Laff
7.3	480i	Shop LC	Shop LC
2.3	480i	CometTV	Comet (KWGN-TV)
2.4	480i	HSN2	HSN2 (KWGN-TV)

Broadcast on behalf of another station

=== Analog-to-digital conversion ===
KMGH-TV shut down its analog signal, over VHF channel 7, on April 16, 2009. The station's digital signal relocated from its pre-transition UHF channel 17 to VHF channel 7. Sister station KZCO-LD signed on a digital signal on KMGH's pre-transition channel position in 2013 to serve as a fill-in translator of KMGH-TV, which has experienced issues with signal reception in portions of the Denver market as VHF channel 7 is prone to signal interference.

=== Translators ===
The following translators rebroadcast KMGH-TV's signal to further extend its coverage area:

- Anton: K29NF-D
- Denver: KSBS-CD
- Haxtun: K36PT-D
- Idalia: K26FP-D
- Julesburg: K36PS-D
- Peetz: K20FS-D
- Pleasant Valley: K20GK-D
- Sterling: KCDO-DT
- Wray: K19ML-D
- Yuma: K35OL-D

KMGH's main channel is further relayed by sister station KCDO-TV and its own translator network into northeastern Colorado and western Nebraska.

The following translators relay KMGH-TV's second and third subchannels only:

- Colorado Springs: KZCS-LD
- Denver: KZCO-LD

== See also ==
- Circle 7 logo
