= Ernie Bjorkman =

American journalist

Ernie Bjorkman is a TV news anchor based in Denver, Colorado. He was the co-anchor on Denver's CW affiliate, KWGN, and has won two Emmy awards as well as Associated Press and Sigma Delta Chi journalism awards. In 2017 he returned to KWGN.

Born in New York City, Bjorkman moved to St. Augustine, Florida in the early 1960s following the death of his father. Bjorkman graduated from the University of Florida in 1972 with a Bachelor of Science degree in Broadcast Journalism. He began his career in West Palm Beach, Florida as a reporter from 1972-1976. In 1976, Bjorkman moved to WSB-TV in Atlanta, Georgia, where he covered events such as Jimmy Carter's rise to the White House and the Atlanta Child Murders.

Bjorkman's Denver career began in 1982 as a field anchor for KMGH-TV. After two years, he joined News2 as the main anchor and managing editor. He returned to KMGH four years later where he worked as an anchor until 1998, before rejoining the News2 team as the primary anchor.

In September 2008, it was announced that KWGN and KDVR, would be combining operations, and would operate out of the KDVR office in downtown Denver. As a result of this combined operating structure, Bjorkman, along with dozens of other employees were laid off. He then became a certified veterinary technician which he did for 2 years at several Colorado vet clinics. Ernie and his new wife, Sue, traveled to Mongolia and China, joined the Peace Corps and spent time in Ethiopia. Upon returning, he and his wife lived on a houseboat in St Augustine Florida where he and Sue were senior models. Ernie also does freelance on-camera work for various companies. It was announced on March 8, 2017 that Ernie sold his houseboat and would be returning to KWGN-TV, (channel 2) as morning news anchor. He officially began March 27, 2017.
