= Ed Sardella =

American journalist

Ed Sardella is a retired news reporter who currently resides in Denver, Colorado. He graduated from Occidental College in Los Angeles, California in 1962. During his four years of undergraduate studies, he spent some time at San Diego State University working in the Broadcasting Department. He received a BA in Speech Arts from Occidental College. After graduating, Sardella served as a communications officer in the US Marine Corps for four years.

== Career ==
After finishing his service in the US Marine Corps, Sardella went to work for several radio stations, including one in Ashland, Oregon, one in Tillamook, Oregon, and another in Eugene, Oregon. In 1969, Sardella decided to pursue television reporting. He was hired as a co-anchor at KBTV in Denver, which became KUSA-TV in 1984. Sardella anchored the 10 o’clock news starting in 1974 and stayed there for almost 25 years. While working at KUSA, the station was the market leader in viewer ratings for almost all of his years there. In 2001, after Sardella retired, the ratings at Channel 9 dipped significantly. After Sardella left Channel 9, Jim Benemann replaced him as anchor.

== Accolades ==
In 1997, the Colorado Broadcasters Association named Sardella Broadcaster of the Year. In his career at KUSA he won many Emmys. He was also awarded one of two half-century awards on 9 News’s 50th anniversary. The awards were given to Sardella in recognition of his contribution to KUSA’s success. Sardella was inducted into the Denver Press Club Hall of Fame and the National Association of Television Arts and Sciences Heartland Chapter Silver Circle. In addition to winning Broadcaster of the Year, Sardella also won Journalist of the Year.

Ed Sardella has won many "Best of Denver" awards through the Denver-based Westword newspaper. Every year Westword gives out its "Best of Denver" awards to celebrate the people and places of Denver, Colorado. In 1984 Sardella won "Best Anchorperson" for his work at KUSA. In 1987 he won "Best TV Anchor" for his work at Channel 9. In 1988 he won "Best Local T.V. Anchor." In 1991, he won "Best Local T.V. Anchor" from both Westword and the Reader's Choice categories. Then in 2000, Sardella won the Reader’s Choice Award for "Best Local T.V. Anchor" again.

== Current ==
After retiring from KUSA, Sardella wrote Write Like You Talk: A Broadcast Newswriting Handbook. The book has been used in many journalism and mass communication classrooms across the country. He also co-wrote the book The Producing Strategy 2.0, which details how to build your own strategy and compete in a world where television news has become the background of life. Sardella also joined Total Longterm Care as a consultant to promote options and resources for caregivers, hosting a series of free town meetings around the Denver metro area.

Sardella still resides in Denver and has hosted "Let’s Talk," a monthly interview show on Government-access television (GATV). He also hosted a weekly radio program on the law and on lawyers on behalf of a nationally recognized law firm from Denver.
