= KUSA (TV) =

Television station in Denver

- Denver, Colorado; United States
- Channels: Digital: 9 (VHF); Virtual: 9
- Branding: 9 News

Programming
- Affiliations: 9.1: NBC; for others, see § Subchannels

Ownership
- Owner: Tegna Inc., a subsidiary of Nexstar Media Group; (Multimedia Holdings Corporation)
- Sister stations: KTVD (Note: Earmarked for divestiture); Nexstar: KWGN-TV, KDVR

History
- First air date: October 12, 1952
- Former call signs: KBTV (1952–1984); KUSA-TV (1984–2009)
- Former channel numbers: Analog: 9 (VHF, 1952–2009); Digital: 16 (UHF, 1997–2009)
- Former affiliations: CBS (1952–1953); NBC (secondary, 1952–1953); DuMont (1953–1956); ABC (secondary 1952–1956, primary 1956–1995)
- Call sign meaning: United States of America; USA Today, owned by Gannett (now USA Today Co.), KUSA's former owner

Technical information
- Licensing authority: FCC
- Facility ID: 23074
- ERP: 45 kW
- HAAT: 352.4 m (1,156 ft)
- Transmitter coordinates: 39°43′50.6″N 105°13′55.6″W
- Translator(s): KTVD 9.4 Denver; for others, see § Translators

Links
- Public license information: Public file; LMS
- Website: www.9news.com

KUSA (channel 9) is a television station in Denver, Colorado, United States, affiliated with NBC. It is owned by the Tegna subsidiary of Nexstar Media Group alongside KTVD (channel 20), an independent station with MyNetworkTV; Nexstar also owns CW station KWGN-TV (channel 2) and Fox affiliate KDVR (channel 31). KUSA and KTVD share studios on East Speer Boulevard in Denver's Speer neighborhood; KUSA's transmitter is located atop Lookout Mountain, near Golden. In addition to its main studios, the station also operates a secondary studio and news bureau on Canyon Avenue in Fort Collins.

== History ==
=== Pre-launch (1952) ===
Following the Federal Communications Commission (FCC)'s "freeze" on new television station licenses in 1948, Colorado politicians, including Senators Edwin C. Johnson and Eugene Millikin, formally protested the commission's proposed allocations for the state. They argued that limiting Denver to three VHF channels would stifle competition and requested additional allocations. When the FCC lifted the freeze in April 1952, the Colorado Television Corporation—owner of radio station KVOD (630 AM)—applied for the channel 9 license on June 19, 1952. The corporation was capitalized at $1 million and led by W. D. Pyle and T. C. Ekrem; major stockholders included Aksel Nielsen (president of the Denver Chamber of Commerce), oilman Maurice Robineau, and former Colorado Attorney General Gail Ireland.

Initially, the application for channel 9 was contested by the Empire Coil Company of New Rochelle, New York. However, Empire Coil amended its application to seek UHF channel 26 instead, wishing to avoid a lengthy competitive hearing. Consequently, on July 11, 1952, the FCC granted construction permits to the Colorado Television Corporation (channel 9), KFEL-TV (channel 2), and Empire Coil (channel 26). These were among the first television grants issued by the government in nearly four years.

Following the grant, station officials initially projected a 90-day timeline to get on the air. In August 1952, the company hired Joe Herold, a former technical director for WOW in Omaha, Nebraska, and consultant for stations in Brazil and Cuba, as the station manager. Jerry Lee was appointed commercial manager, while Ekrem traveled to New York to negotiate a network affiliation. Although the station was informally referred to as KVOD-TV in the press throughout the summer, the FCC officially assigned the call letters KBTV on September 11, 1952.

Construction of the station's transmitter building and the erection of a 75-foot (23 m) six-bay antenna took place on Lookout Mountain in September 1952, located directly south of the transmitter for KFEL-TV, which had launched in July. While the station set a firm launch date of September 29, delays in the delivery of a 2,000-watt amplifier from the Radio Corporation of America forced a postponement. Further technical difficulties with the transmitter stalled attempts to air a test pattern on September 30 and October 1.

=== Launch and first years (1952–1954) ===
KBTV began broadcasting test patterns on October 2, 1952, operating under a special temporary authority from the FCC. The station officially commenced regular commercial programming at 2:15 p.m. on October 12, 1952. It was the second television station to sign on in the Denver market, launching just over three months after KFEL-TV, which had signed on July 18. The first program aired on the station was Quiz Kids at 2:30 p.m. Upon its debut, KBTV served as a primary affiliate of both CBS and ABC, carrying a slate of programming that included Super Circus and What's My Line?.

Weeks after its launch, KBTV participated in the first coast-to-coast television coverage of a presidential election on November 4, 1952. The station utilized feeds from both CBS and ABC to broadcast returns for the race between Dwight D. Eisenhower and Adlai Stevenson II. The station's high-altitude transmitter site on Lookout Mountain proved vulnerable to severe weather and technical faults during its early years. Viewers reported outages during the election cycle due to transmitter difficulties, and severe electrical storms and high winds caused power failures and equipment misalignment in August and December 1953.

Originally operating from studios at 1100 California Street, the station purchased a 30,000-square-foot (2,800 m^{2}) building—a former automobile agency and car dealership—at 1089 Bannock Street in November 1952. Operations moved to the new facility in May 1953. In July 1953, KBTV increased its effective radiated power to 240,000 watts, the maximum permitted for the channel at the time.

The Denver television market underwent a significant realignment in late 1953 with the launch of KLZ-TV (channel 7) and KOA-TV (channel 4). Channel 9 gained an affiliation with the DuMont Television Network in 1953, but lost CBS programming to KLZ-TV when that station signed on in November of that year; this was followed by the loss of the NBC affiliation to KOA-TV when it signed on a month later. This left KBTV as a primary DuMont and secondary ABC affiliate. It would become a full-time ABC affiliate when DuMont ceased operations in 1956. To adapt to the loss of network programming during this transition, station management emphasized local productions. In February 1953, the station began airing a weekly program sponsored by the Denver Bears baseball team. Long before the establishment of the Denver Broncos, KBTV served as the outlet for National Football League games, broadcasting Chicago Bears and Chicago Cardinals home games on Sundays.

The station also engaged in significant public service efforts early on. In April 1953, KBTV broadcast a 14-hour telethon for United Cerebral Palsy, featuring national personalities like Dennis James and raising $125,000. The event became an annual tradition, with the second iteration in 1954 featuring Warren Hull and utilizing over 1,000 volunteers. However, local programming did not always meet with viewer approval. In January 1954, a broadcast of a horse show and rodeo drew complaints for excessive interruptions by commercials and interviews. Station producer Everett Wren publicly acknowledged the criticism, stating the station was still learning how to balance coverage for such events.

In late 1953, amidst public speculation about the arrival of color broadcasting, KBTV aired a five-week series titled Debunking Color. The program, moderated by station executives and electrical league officials, was designed to explain the technical and economic obstacles remaining before color television could become a reality in Denver.

=== Mullins ownership (1955–1959) ===
In March 1955, the FCC approved the sale of KBTV from the Colorado Television Company to TV Denver, Inc. for $900,000. The new ownership group was led by John C. Mullins of Tulsa, Oklahoma, and Frank R. Leu of Nashville, Tennessee, each holding a 50 percent interest. The sale separated the television station from its original radio partner, KVOD. Under Mullins' ownership (later organized as Mullins Broadcasting), the station would eventually form a radio news partnership with KBTR (710 AM) that lasted until the mid-1980s. Upon taking over in 1955, Mullins faced a station losing approximately $25,000 per month. He implemented changes that eventually turned the operation profitable, with the station's valuation reportedly rising to $3.5 million by 1958. The ownership structure shifted again in 1956 when Leu petitioned the FCC to transfer his 50 percent interest to the New York–based real estate firm Webb & Knapp, headed by William Zeckendorf. Under this arrangement, Zeckendorf became chairman of the board while Mullins remained president.

During this period, the station explored relocating its facilities. In late 1955, KBTV abandoned a $100,000 remodeling project at its Bannock Street studios amid rumors of a move to the Courthouse Square development. By 1957, plans were announced to move the station's studios into the Denver Hilton hotel (now the Sheraton Denver Downtown Hotel), then under construction by Zeckendorf's firm. The proposed facility was to occupy 34,000 square feet (3,200 m^{2}) on two sub-surface levels. However, in April 1959, these plans were canceled when the hotel space was reallocated for a ballroom and exhibit hall. Consequently, Mullins announced that the station would instead remodel and expand its existing headquarters at 1089 Bannock Street.

In November 1955, KBTV entered a partnership with The Denver Post to produce a daily afternoon news segment. The program featured Post editors and reporters presenting stories directly from the newspaper's newsroom, a collaboration described by publisher Palmer Hoyt as a "joint endeavor" between competing media. The station also expanded its local coverage with the launch of Crime Report, Denver in 1956 and the first televised coverage of the Lakeside Amusement Park fireworks display that July. In January 1957, KBTV began broadcasting daily highlights of the National Western Stock Show. This marked the beginning of a broadcasting tradition that the station (now KUSA) has continued annually to the present day. In April 1959, the station secured rights to televise nine Denver Bears baseball games, utilizing a five-camera setup to boost interest in the team.

As an ABC affiliate, KBTV benefited from the network's ratings surge in the late 1950s, driven by the popularity of westerns such as Maverick. However, the station drew significant viewer ire in March 1959 during a broadcast of a championship fight between Archie Moore and Hogan Bassey. When the fight ended abruptly in the 13th round, the station cut away to a scheduled block of local commercials rather than showing the official decision or explaining the fight's conclusion, leading to a deluge of complaints.

In September 1957, Mullins submitted an informal application to the Denver City Council seeking authority to introduce a subscription television service. The proposal outlined potential delivery methods, including wire systems or scrambled air signals, to offer exclusive programming such as major sports and theatrical productions. Like other Denver stations, KBTV's operations were severely impacted by a massive blizzard in April 1957. A power line failure on Lookout Mountain knocked the station off the air for nearly 20 hours, with engineers snowshoeing into the transmitter site to restore operations. Tragedy struck the technical staff the following year; in December 1958, engineer Joe Pershin died of a cerebral hemorrhage while installing microwave equipment on a rooftop for a remote telecast.

=== Combined and Gannett ownership (1972–1995) ===
KUSA's current numerical logo, used since 1984.

In 1972, Mullins Broadcasting sold KBTV and sister station KARK-TV in Little Rock, Arkansas, to the Combined Communications Corporation, owned jointly by Phoenix advertising mogul Karl Eller and Chicago advertiser John J. Louis Sr., which already owned its flagship advertising business and stations KTAR-AM-TV. Combined's station properties would eventually be merged into the Gannett Company seven years later in May 1978, in what was the largest media merger in United States history at the time.

In order to align itself with Gannett's new newspaper entity USA Today, the station changed its call letters to KUSA-TV on March 19, 1984. In April 1992, KUSA moved its operations into a new state-of-the-art facility at 500 Speer Boulevard; the original studio location was subsequently occupied by KRMA-TV (channel 6).

=== NBC affiliation (1995–present) ===
On July 14, 1994, as a result of an affiliation agreement between the E. W. Scripps Company and ABC that was spurred by Fox's affiliation deal with New World Communications, CBS and Westinghouse Broadcasting (Group W) agreed to a long-term affiliation deal that saw longtime ABC affiliate WJZ-TV in Baltimore and longtime NBC affiliates KYW-TV in Philadelphia and WBZ-TV in Boston become CBS affiliates. Westinghouse's other two stations, KDKA-TV in Pittsburgh and KPIX-TV in San Francisco, were already longtime CBS affiliates. That November, NBC traded KCNC-TV (the former KOA-TV), which was the network's owned-and-operated station at the time, to CBS in return for CBS's former O&O in Philadelphia, WCAU, as a result of a complex ownership deal between the network, Westinghouse and NBC. CBS had originally planned to sell WCAU to NBC as part of its plan to move its affiliation to KYW-TV, but discovered that an outright sale would incur heavy capital gains taxes on proceeds from the deal. To make the transaction a legal trade, the network swapped ownership of KCNC-TV and KUTV in Salt Lake City (which NBC had acquired earlier that year), along with the VHF channel 4 frequency and transmitter in Miami (then home to WTVJ), to CBS in exchange for WCAU and the channel 6 frequency in Miami (then home to WCIX, which subsequently became WFOR-TV). NBC then signed an affiliation agreement with KUSA, bypassing Denver's incumbent CBS affiliate, KMGH-TV (the former KLZ-TV).

Gannett then signed a multi-station affiliation agreement with NBC that included KUSA. This resulted in all three of Denver's "Big Three" stations swapping affiliations at 12:07 a.m. on September 10, 1995, which resulted in KUSA switching to NBC, KMGH switching to ABC, and KCNC switching to CBS; Westinghouse had purchased CBS in a group deal one month before, making KCNC a CBS owned-and-operated station when the deal was finalized on November 24 of that year. The final ABC program to air on channel 9 was a repeat of the ABC Saturday Night at the Movies feature Gremlins 2: The New Batch, on September 9, 1995.

In August 2007, KUSA began the "9NEWS High School Hotshots Program", which awarded one of twelve student athletes from Colorado's high schools nominated for their academic excellence, selected by the school's administration and staff that recorded their high school football games; the program has since extended to cover winter sports at the schools.

Like many Gannett stations, KUSA dropped the "-TV" suffix ten days after the official digital television transition date of June 12, 2009, although KUSA had made the transition to digital-exclusive broadcasts nearly two months earlier.

On June 29, 2015, the Gannett Company split in two, with one side specializing in print media and the other side specializing in broadcast and digital media. KUSA and KTVD were retained by the latter company, named Tegna.

On August 19, 2025, Nexstar Media Group agreed to acquire Tegna for $6.2 billion. In Denver, Nexstar already owned KDVR (channel 31) and KWGN-TV (the former KFEL-TV). The deal was approved and completed on March 19, 2026. As part of the transaction, Nexstar committed to the divestiture of KTVD within two years, along with five other stations in markets where the two companies combined held four TV station licenses. KUSA continues to operate separately from KDVR as the legality of the merger is challenged, with Phil Weiser of Colorado among eight state attorneys general who have filed to block the deal.

== Programming ==
KUSA clears the entire NBC schedule, although it airs the fourth hour of Today one hour later than most NBC affiliates at 11 a.m., and until September 2022, aired Days of Our Lives (now streaming exclusively on Peacock) at 2 p.m. (the secondary slot to NBC's primary recommended 1 p.m. timeslot), with syndicated programs airing in the preceding hour (Days aired on KUSA at 3 p.m. upon joining NBC in 1995 and continued to air in that slot until the fall of 2003, when it acquired Ellen and moved Days to 1 p.m., where it remained until the 2007 cancellation of Passions). It also airs NBC's Heart of a Champion on Wednesday afternoons instead of the show's recommended early Saturday afternoon time slot (most NBC stations air it at 12:30 p.m. on Saturdays).

The station struggled in the ratings for several years, in part because ABC's overall ratings were not on par with the other major networks until the 1970s. The station lost the DuMont affiliation when the network shut down on August 6, 1956, which left the station as an exclusive ABC affiliate. In 1969, the station gained some national attention for refusing to air the ABC sketch comedy series Turn-On as the network's affiliates east of the Rocky Mountains voiced displeasure about the program's risqué content during the airing of the pilot episode, with some pulling the program off the air during its broadcast, leading to its cancellation by the network after just one episode.

On the day KUSA joined NBC, it took over KCNC's role as the default home station for the Denver Broncos (who are part of the AFC, which NBC held the broadcast rights to then, channel 4 had aired most Broncos games from 1965 until the 1995 season-opening game a week before the switch), but would only hold this role for only three seasons; however, channel 9 did air the Broncos' first Super Bowl victory in Super Bowl XXXII in 1998 (it also happened to be the last Broncos game aired on the station [and the last NFL game for NBC] for eight years); after this, KCNC, thanks to CBS' acquisition of the AFC broadcast rights, resumed its role as the home station of the team. Since 2006, Broncos games are aired on channel 9 when they are shown on NBC's Sunday Night Football. KUSA also aired any Denver Nuggets contests via the NBA on NBC from 1995 to 2002, and Colorado Avalanche games via the NHL on NBC from 2006 to 2021.

KUSA produces a daily lifestyle program called Colorado & Company, that features paid segments by local companies and made its debut in September 2004; it airs at 10 a.m. following the third hour of Today. Colorado & Company was rebroadcast on KPXC-TV (channel 59) from its debut, until the conclusion of NBC's affiliate partnership and partial ownership of Pax TV in June 2005. KUSA ran the Gannett ID and sounder (often colloquially nicknamed the "Death Star") at the end of the station's weeknight 6 p.m. newscasts from 1994 to 2011; in June 2011, KUSA began to show Gannett's new corporate ID tag at the end of all of the station's newscasts, except for the weekday morning programs; as of December 2015, they showed Tegna's ID after all of their newscasts.

Beginning with the 2024–25 NBA season and the 2024–25 NHL season, sister station KTVD reached an agreement with Altitude Sports and Entertainment to simulcast 20 Denver Nuggets games and 20 Colorado Avalanche games. Ten games would also be simulcast on KUSA. This was in addition to any games selected for broadcast on Tuesday and Sunday nights when NBC's NBA contract begins in the 2025–26 season. KTVD would later agree to simulcast ten Colorado Rockies games produced by MLB Local Media in the 2025 MLB season, with five of those scheduled for simulcast on KUSA.

=== News operation ===
News logo for KUSA from 1996 to 2020.

Current News logo for KUSA used since 2020.

KUSA presently broadcasts a total of 41 hours of locally produced newscasts each week (with 6 3/5 hours each weekday and four hours each on Saturdays and Sundays); this does not account for newscasts aired on KTVD (combined, however, 9 News broadcasts 55 1/2 hours of local news, and has the second highest local newscast output in the state of Colorado behind Nexstar's KDVR and KWGN combined). The station also provides daily weather forecasts for the formerly co-owned Fort Collins Coloradoan newspaper. Until November 2016, KUSA provided local weather updates for six radio stations owned by Entercom: KQMT (99.5 FM), KALC (105.9 FM), K276FK (103.1 FM), KQKS (107.5 FM), KKSE (950 AM) and KEZW (1430 AM); this partnership began on January 1, 2008, after the station's agreement to provide forecasts for KOA (850 AM) radio ended. Weather segments during the station's newscasts are typically presented in the "9 Back Yard", a courtyard outside the Speer Boulevard studios that features a chroma key wall and robotic camera (local weather inserts for The Today Show and updates for 9NEWS Now are done from a chroma key wall inside the weather center).

In addition to its main studios in downtown Denver, KUSA operates a "Northern Newsroom" that based out of the Coloradoan offices in Fort Collins; the bureau employs a rotating staff of reporters and photojournalists out of Denver. The station also operates a "Mountain Newsroom" based in Silverthorne. The station's weather radar is presented on-air as "HD-Doppler 9", a DWSR-10001C radar model supplied by Enterprise Electronics Corporation that is located near Elizabeth and operates at a radiated power of 1 million watts. KUSA brands its websites and sister television properties under the "9NEWS Networks" banner (described by KUSA as its three websites: 9News.com, m.9News.com and HighSchoolSports.net; KTVD (channel 20) and its website; the 9NEWS Now digital subchannel; Metromix; Telemundo owned-and-operated station KDEN-TV (channel 25, whose Spanish-language newscasts are produced by KUSA through a news share agreement) and the "9NEWS Weather Call" weather alert service).

For the better part of the last four decades, KUSA's newscasts (currently titled as 9 News) have dominated Denver's local news ratings. In February 1976, Ed Sardella and John Rayburn anchored the weeknight editions of the 10 p.m. newscast, helping that program overtake longtime leader KMGH-TV for first place in the ratings; Rayburn was succeeded by Mike Landess in 1977. Landess and Sardella would remain as channel 9's top anchor team until Landess left for KUSA's Atlanta sister station WXIA-TV in late 1993. Adele Arakawa, who had been an anchor at WBBM-TV in Chicago, was hired to succeed Landess. Sardella retired from the anchor desk in 2000, and was succeeded by Jim Benemann, but returned briefly in 2003 to replace Benemann when he left for KCNC-TV. Landess, after anchoring at WTTG in Washington, D.C., returned to Denver at rival KMGH-TV in 2002.

The "KUSA News Package" (created by Third Street Music, composed and produced by Rob Barrett Jr.) was commissioned by KUSA as the theme music for its newscasts in 1995. Scenes for the NBC made-for-TV movie Asteroid were shot at the KUSA studios; the producers filmed the fictional news reports seen in the movie out of the station's 1996–2004 news set. On October 15, 2008, KUSA debuted a standardized graphics package for the Gannett stations created by the Gannett Graphics Group, along with a standardized music package composed by Rampage Music New York. The closing cut of the previous theme was last used on February 6, 2009, and the remastered talent bumper cut was used until January 10, 2013 (Minneapolis sister station KARE continued to use its own custom theme composed in 1996 by Third Street Music called the "KARE 11 News Theme" (also composed and produced by Rob Barrett Jr.) until January 25, 2013, when it discontinued it for a new standardized news package by Gari Media Group called "This Is Home"). KUSA formerly rebroadcast its weeknight 6 and 10 p.m. newscasts on KPXC-TV as part of an agreement between NBC and Pax TV to provide news re-broadcasts from the network's stations on Pax's owned-and-operated stations nationally, which ended in June 2005 upon that network's rebrand to I: Independent Television.

In April 2004, KUSA became the first television station in the Denver market, the first Gannett-owned station and the second U.S. television station to begin producing its local newscasts in high definition. On September 5, 2006, KUSA began to produce a daily half-hour prime time newscast at 9 p.m. on sister station KTVD, coinciding with that station's affiliation switch from UPN to MyNetworkTV; this expanded on December 5, 2006, to include a two-hour extension of KUSA's weekday morning newscast from 7 to 9 a.m. and later to weekend morning newscasts at 6 a.m. on KTVD. During the November 2007 sweeps period, KCNC's newscasts surged over KUSA in the 5 p.m. timeslot for the first time in over a decade, that station also overtook KUSA in overall sign-on to sign-off numbers (this is partially due to KCNC's shift towards investigative reports and human interest stories, though the strength of CBS' prime time lineup and viewership declines for NBC prime time also played a factor). Overall, KUSA remains the highest-rated local news outlet in the market despite a very close ratings battle between it, KCNC-TV and KMGH-TV.

On March 6, 2009, KUSA began streaming its noon newscast on the station's website, with a live chat room feature included next to the streaming player (the station now streams all newscasts seen on KUSA and KTVD). In June 2010, KUSA expanded its weekday morning newscast to 2 1/2 hours with the addition of a half-hour at 4:30 a.m.; the KUSA-produced 9 p.m. newscast on KTVD also expanded to one hour that month. On February 20, 2012, KUSA updated its HD-ready set constructed in 2004 to feature a new backdrop for its daytime newscasts that is a variant of its evening backdrop photograph in a daytime setting. On June 3 of that year, KUSA's newscasts were relocated to a temporary set in "Studio B" for two weeks while their primary news set received updated duratrans.

In January 2016, KUSA announced that they would be constructing a brand new studio to "better cover and explain the news". The new studio and set, which was completed in March, replaced the previous one, which debuted in 2004. Newscasts were relocated to the news room temporarily before moving to another temporary set.

==== Reception ====
In 1986, the Committee for Skeptical Inquiry (CSICOP) presented KUSA anchor and investigative reporter Ward Lucas with the Responsibility in Journalism award, "In recognition of contributions to fair and balanced reporting of paranormal claims".

==== Notable former on-air staff ====
- Adele Arakawa – main anchor (1993–2017)
- Heidi Collins – anchor/reporter (1999–2002)
- Kevin Corke – sports anchor/reporter (1989–1999)
- Tom Costello – reporter (1988–1994)
- Monica Gayle – anchor (1980s)
- Phil Keating – lead reporter (1994–2000)
- Bill Kuster – weather anchor (1979–1996)
- Josh Moser – sports anchor and journalist
- Regis Philbin – fill-in sports anchor (1974)
- Leon "Stormy" Rottman – chief meteorologist (1969–1988)
- Ed Sardella – weeknight anchor (1974–2000, 2003)

== In popular culture ==
A newscast from the station (as KBTV) was featured prominently in the 1980 Stanley Kubrick film The Shining, set in Colorado.

== Technical information ==
=== Subchannels ===
The station's signal is multiplexed:

Subchannels of KUSA
Subchannel	Res.	Short name	Programming
9.1	1080i	KUSA-HD	NBC
9.2	480i	Cozi	Cozi TV
9.3	480i	Crime	True Crime Network
9.5	480i	Quest	Quest
9.6	480i	NEST	The Nest
2.2	480i	CHARGE	Charge! (KWGN-TV)

Broadcast on behalf of another station

In April 2005, KUSA began carrying NBC Weather Plus on its second digital subchannel (branded as "9NEWS Weather Plus"). On December 31, 2008, following NBC Weather Plus' shutdown, KUSA affiliated the subchannel with The Local AccuWeather Channel; on May 27, 2013, as part of a multi-station deal between Gannett and the network, KUSA 9.2 switched its affiliation to WeatherNation TV. Digital subchannel 9.2 is carried on cable through Comcast digital channel 249 and CenturyLink Prism channel 10. On August 27, 2017, at noon MDT, KUSA temporarily switched digital subchannel 9.2 from WeatherNation TV to a live feed of a WFAA/KHOU simulcast covering the aftermath of Hurricane Harvey after it flooded the Houston metro area. This simulcast ended on August 31, 2017, at 6:30 p.m. MDT when the subchannel returned to WeatherNation TV. On December 29, 2018, KUSA dropped WeatherNation TV from the channel and switched to Cozi TV.

In late January 2015, KUSA began to broadcast a duplicate 1080i signal of their primary digital subchannel (9.1) on the KTVD (RF 31) transmitter as digital subchannel 9.4, "KUSA-HD". This allows viewers with issues receiving KUSA's VHF signal or with a UHF-only antenna to view KUSA in some form over the air.

=== Analog-to-digital conversion ===
KUSA shut down its analog signal, over VHF channel 9, on April 16, 2009. The station's digital signal relocated from its pre-transition UHF channel 16 to VHF channel 9.

=== Translators ===
KUSA operates a large network of translators to relay its signal to portions of Colorado, Nebraska and Wyoming within and adjacent to the Denver market.

- K08ND-D Akron
- K33FI-D Akron
- K14NM-D Anton
- K15IF-D Basalt
- K34PW-D Haxtun
- K21FF-D Holyoke
- K14LB-D Idalia
- K22CQ-D Idalia
- K18KH-D Julesburg
- K32EX-D Peetz
- K18GM-D Pleasant Valley
- K16NS-D Redstone
- K30HA-D Yuma

== See also ==
- List of news aircraft accidents and incidents
