= HSN2 =

Protein

hereditary sensory neuropathy, type II

Identifiers
- Symbol: HSN2
- NCBI gene: 378465
- HGNC: 23152
- OMIM: 608620
- RefSeq: NM_213655
- UniProt: Q6IFS5

Other data
- Locus: Chr. 12 p13.33
Search for
- Structures: Swiss-model
- Domains: InterPro

Hereditary sensory neuropathy, type II also known as HSN2 is a region of a parent protein which in humans is encoded by the WNK1 gene. It is a transcript variant of the WNK1 gene that is selectively expressed in nervous system tissues, and during development. Mutations in this exon of the WNK1 gene have been identified as causative in genetic neuropathy syndromes, and in inherited pain insensitivity.

== Function ==
The HSN2-containing WNK1 isoforms are expressed in the sensory transducing neurons both in the peripheral nervous system and the central nervous system. The sensory afferent neurons expressing the HSN2 splice variant of WNK1 are associated with the transmission of sensory and nociceptive signals. The novel protein product of the isoform is more plentiful in sensory neurons than motor neurons. It is proposed that this gene product may play a role in the development and/or maintenance of peripheral sensory neurons or their supporting Schwann cells.

== Clinical significance ==
Mutations in the HSN2-containing splice variants of the WNK1 gene are associated with congenital sensory neuropathy (HSAN Type II), an autosomal recessive disorder characterized by impairment of pain, temperature, and touch sensation owing to reduction or absence of peripheral sensory neurons.
