= KDEN-TV =

Television station in Longmont, Colorado

- Longmont–Denver, Colorado; United States
- City: Longmont, Colorado
- Channels: Digital: 29 (UHF); Virtual: 25
- Branding: Telemundo Denver

Programming
- Affiliations: 25.1: Telemundo; for others, see § Subchannels

Ownership
- Owner: Telemundo Station Group; (NBC Telemundo License LLC)

History
- First air date: March 31, 1997
- Former channel numbers: Analog: 25 (UHF, 1997–2009)
- Former affiliations: Independent (1997–2006)
- Call sign meaning: Denver (also the IATA airport code for the Denver International Airport)

Technical information
- Licensing authority: FCC
- Facility ID: 38375
- ERP: 800 kW
- HAAT: 379.1 m (1,244 ft)
- Transmitter coordinates: 40°5′59″N 104°54′4″W

Links
- Public license information: Public file; LMS
- Website: www.telemundodenver.com

KDEN-TV (channel 25) is a television station licensed to Longmont, Colorado, United States, serving as the Denver area outlet for the Spanish-language network Telemundo. Owned and operated by NBCUniversal's Telemundo Station Group, KDEN-TV maintains studios at the Comcast Media Center on East Dry Creek Road in Centennial, and its transmitter is located in rural southwestern Weld County (east of Frederick).

== History ==
The station first signed on the air on March 31, 1997. Founded by locally owned Longmont Broadcasting, KDEN originally operated as an independent station. On January 19, 2006, Longmont Broadcasting sold KDEN to NBC Universal, making the second television station in the Denver market to have been an owned-and-operated station under NBC ownership—after KCNC-TV (channel 4, now a CBS owned-and-operated station), which was owned by the network from 1986 to 1995, the company's 17th Spanish-language television station and the third network O&O in the market overall (alongside KCNC and KDVR (channel 31), which Fox would eventually sell in 2008).

Channel 25 became the market's Telemundo owned-and-operated station on March 6, Before moving to KDEN, Telemundo programming was seen in Denver on low-power stations KMAS-LP (channel 63) and KSBS-LP (channel 47), which both served as repeaters of KMAS-TV (channel 24) in Steamboat Springs; after NBC Universal purchased KDEN, it donated the KMAS-TV license and transmitter facility to Rocky Mountain PBS, which changed its call letters to KRMZ, while KSBS-LP was sold to Denver Digital Television (NBC retained KMAS-LP, which moved to channel 33 in 2008, was converted to digital station KMAS-LD in 2012, and remained a repeater of KDEN-TV until its license was cancelled on December 6, 2019).

== Newscasts ==
KDEN-TV presently broadcasts five hours of locally produced newscasts each week (with one hour each weekday); the station does not broadcast local newscasts on Saturdays or Sundays. Upon affiliating with Telemundo, KDEN aired locally produced news cut-ins during the national evening newscasts Noticiero Telemundo and Noticiero Telemundo Internacional; the inserts were discontinued late that year as a result of budget cutbacks imposed by NBC Universal.

On July 29, 2011, KDEN announced a news share agreement with NBC affiliate KUSA (channel 9) to produce Spanish-language newscasts for the station. The half-hour newscasts, airing at 5:30 and 10 p.m. weeknights and branded as Noticiero Telemundo Denver/9News en Español, debuted on October 3, 2011, and utilize a separate on-air staff that is exclusive to the KDEN broadcasts; the programs are produced out of a secondary set at KUSA's studio facility on East Speer Boulevard, and have been broadcast in high-definition from their launch.

On October 20, 2014, KDEN added a 4:30 p.m. newscast and moved its 5:30 show to 5 p.m. In July 2015, the station began producing its own newscasts from the Comcast Media Center in Centennial, retaining a content partnership with KUSA. As a result, the KDEN news staff grew from four people prior to the move to 18 in 2016. KDEN is one of the 11 Telemundo owned and operated stations that do not produce midday newscasts.

== Technical information ==
=== Subchannels ===
The station's signal is multiplexed:

Subchannels of KDEN-TV
Channel	Res.	Short name	Programming
25.1	1080i	KDEN-DT	Telemundo
25.2	480i	Exitos	TeleXitos (4:3)
25.3	480i	COZI	Cozi TV
25.4	480i	CRIMES	NBC True CRMZ
25.5	480i	Oxygen	Oxygen (4:3)
25.6	480i	Nosey	Nosey

=== Analog-to-digital conversion ===
KDEN-TV shut down its analog signal, over UHF channel 25, on June 12, 2009, the official date on which full-power television stations in the United States transitioned from analog to digital broadcasts under federal mandate. The station's digital signal remained on its pre-transition UHF channel 29, using virtual channel 25.
