= KCDO-TV =

Television station in Sterling, Colorado

- Sterling–Denver, Colorado; United States
- City: Sterling, Colorado
- Channels: Digital: 23 (UHF); Virtual: 3
- Branding: The Spot Denver 3

Programming
- Affiliations: 3.1: Independent; 7.1: ABC; for others, see § Subchannels

Ownership
- Owner: E. W. Scripps Company; (Scripps Broadcasting Holdings LLC)
- Sister stations: KMGH-TV, KZCO-LD, KOAA-TV

History
- First air date: December 28, 1963
- Former call signs: KTVS (1963–2002); KUPN (2002–2008)
- Former channel numbers: Analog: 3 (VHF, 1963–2009)
- Former affiliations: CBS (1963–1999); UPN (1999–2006); America One; (2006–2009); RTV (2009–2010); Independent (2010–2020); Grit (2020–2021)
- Call sign meaning: Colorado

Technical information
- Licensing authority: FCC
- Facility ID: 63158
- ERP: 1,000 kW
- HAAT: 402 m (1,319 ft)
- Transmitter coordinates: 40°2′1.2″N 103°56′18.9″W
- Translator(s): see § Translators

Links
- Public license information: Public file; LMS
- Website: www.denver7.com/the-spot-denver-3

KCDO-TV (channel 3), branded The Spot – Denver 3, is an independent television station licensed to Sterling, Colorado, United States, serving the Denver area. It is owned by the E. W. Scripps Company alongside ABC affiliate KMGH-TV (channel 7). The two stations share studios on Delgany Street in Denver's River North Art District; KCDO-TV's transmitter is located in rural southwestern Morgan County, east of Frederick.

== History ==
The McCracken family, owners of CBS affiliate KFBC-TV (channel 5, now KGWN-TV) in Cheyenne, Wyoming, applied for a construction permit in February 1962 to build a television station on channel 3 in Sterling. The permit was granted a year later, and channel 3 came to air on December 28, 1963, as KTVS, operating it as a satellite station of KFBC.

In September 1999, Newsweb Corporation, operating under the licensee Channel 20 TV Company (CTTC), acquired KTVS from Benedek Broadcasting, then-owners of KGWN, with the intent of making KTVS a satellite of Newsweb's Denver station KTVD (channel 20, after which the Channel 20 TV Company received its name). It became one of very few satellite stations in the United States that predated the existence of the television station that its signal relayed, as KTVD had signed on in December 1988. On January 8, 2002, Channel 20 TV Company changed the station's call letters to KUPN, to reflect the UPN affiliation held by its parent station at the time. CTTC sold KTVD to the Gannett Company in June 2006, but retained ownership of KUPN, converting it into an affiliate of America One.

On July 21, 2008, Channel 20 TV Company changed the station's call letters to KCDO. To increase its signal coverage to reach a wider range of viewers, the station applied to build a new transmitter facility located southwest of Fort Morgan. The new location and increased transmitter power added most of the Denver metro area as well as Fort Collins, Greeley, Longmont and Loveland to the station's service area. Construction on the new tower was completed in January 2010. On December 31, 2008, satellite provider Dish Network began carrying KCDO on its lineup for subscribers in the Denver market. DirecTV also added the channel on January 28, 2009.

KCDO affiliated with the Retro Television Network in 2009. The network was previously seen in Denver on KQDK-CA, before RTV severed its ties with Equity Media Holdings. For a time, the station also simulcast KGWN-TV's newscasts for the Colorado side of the Cheyenne market (carried by that station's second digital subchannel), branded as Northern Colorado 5 News, which was co-produced by KGWN and the Independent News Network.

On November 1, 2010, KCDO dropped its affiliation with the Retro Television Network, in favor of converting into an independent station with a focus on locally produced programming.

=== Sale to Scripps ===
On September 22, 2020, the E. W. Scripps Company announced it was buying KCDO-TV and KSBS-CD for an undisclosed price, pending approval of the Federal Communications Commission (FCC), making them sister stations to ABC affiliate KMGH-TV (channel 7). The sale was completed on November 20.

In late 2025, KCDO announced a multi-year agreement with Denver Summit FC of the National Women's Soccer League to become the teams local broadcast partner for the inaugural 2026 season.

== Programming ==
KCDO-TV may air ABC network programming should it be preempted by KMGH-TV for long-form breaking news or severe weather coverage, special programming, and when KMGH-TV is broadcasting Thursday Night Football games featuring the Denver Broncos under the NFL's syndication policy of non-broadcast television games in primary markets. The station also acts as a full-power relay of KMGH's main channel via its dedicated subchannel, to expand KMGH's coverage throughout northeastern Colorado and portions of western Nebraska through KCDO's translator network.

== Technical information ==
=== Subchannels ===
The station's signal is multiplexed:

Subchannels of KCDO-TV
| Channel | Res. | Short name | Programming |
|---|---|---|---|
| 3.1 | 720p | Local3 | Main KCDO-TV programming |
| 3.2 | 480i | Grit SD | Grit |
| 7.1 | 720p | KMGH-TV | ABC (KMGH-TV) |
| 10.1 | 480i | Laff | Laff |
| 10.2 | 480i | Ion | Ion |
| 10.3 | 480i | QVC | QVC |

Simulcast of subchannels of another station

=== Translators ===
- K11UW-D Akron
- KSBS-CD 19 Denver
- K20KO-D Julesburg
- K34OS-D Sterling, South Logan County
- KZDC-LD 26 Windsor
- K34AC-D Yuma
- KCDO-TV (DRT) 23 Kimball, NE
- KCDO-TV (DRT) 34 Sidney, NE

=== Analog-to-digital conversion ===
KCDO-TV shut down its analog signal, over VHF channel 3, on June 12, 2009, the official date on which full-power television stations in the United States transitioned from analog to digital broadcasts under federal mandate. The station's digital signal remained on its pre-transition UHF channel 23, using virtual channel 3.
