= Lookout Mountain Park =

Historic park in Denver, US

- U.S. National Register of Historic Places
- U.S. Historic district
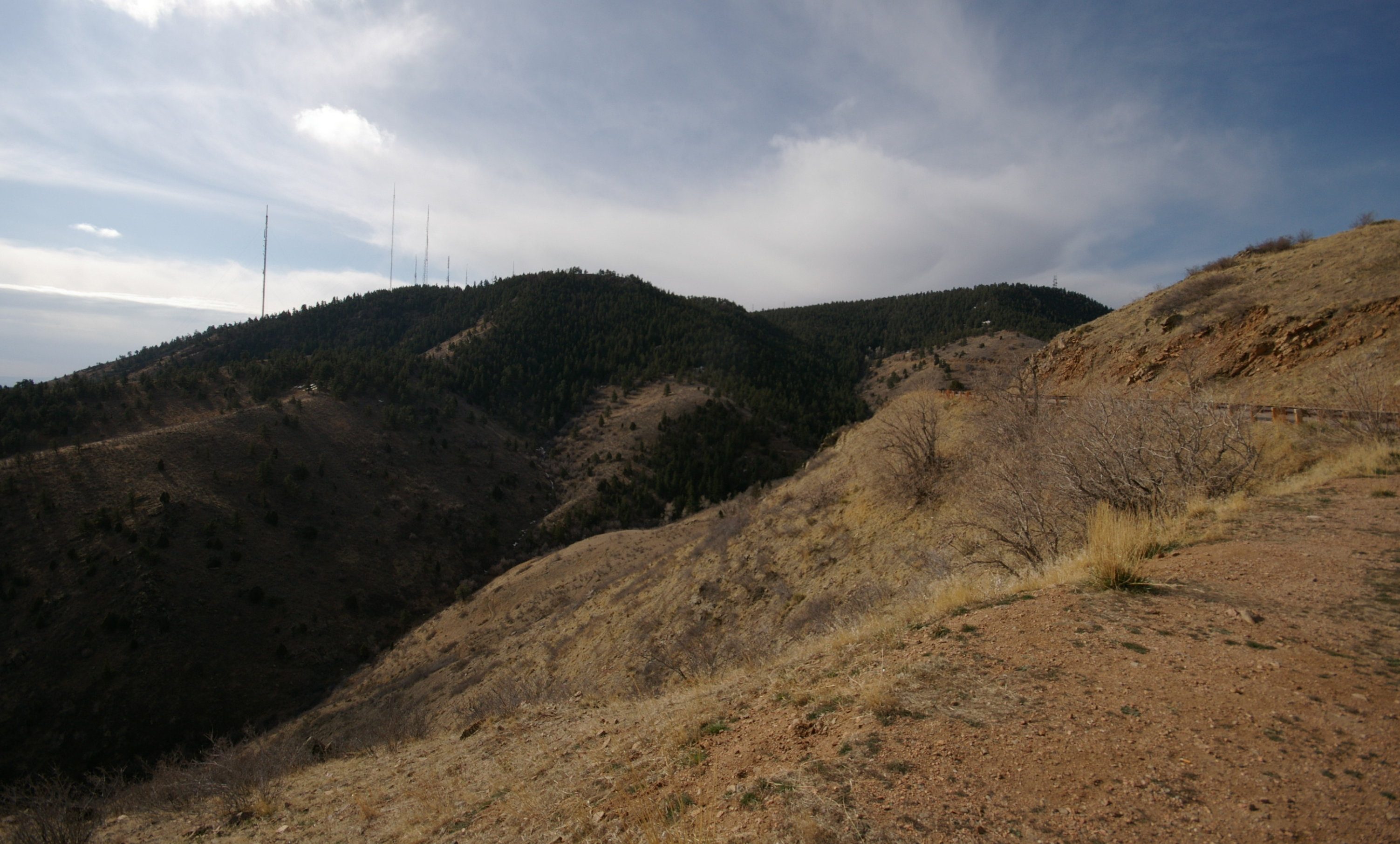

- Location within Colorado Location within the United States
- Nearest city: Golden, Colorado
- Coordinates: 39°43′58″N 105°14′28″W
- Built: 1913
- Architect: Olmsted Brothers; Olmsted, Frederick Law, Jr.
- Architectural style: Rustic
- MPS: Denver Mountain Parks MPS
- NRHP reference No.: 90001713
- Added to NRHP: November 15, 1990

Lookout Mountain Park is a Denver Mountain Park located around 12 miles (20 km) west of downtown Denver overlooking Golden, Colorado. It consists of 65.7 acres (266,000 m^{2}) of evergreen wilderness atop Lookout Mountain, named for its being a favored lookout point of the native Ute Indian tribe. Lookout Mountain Park is the burial site of the internationally famous western frontiersman William Frederick "Buffalo Bill" Cody, and is listed on the National Register of Historic Places.

== Early history ==
In 1889, a group of prominent area businessmen and residents proposed the idea of creating a mountain park as a getaway point for people from the urban city. After a lively competition between Lookout Mountain and Eden Park in Jefferson County west of Denver, Lookout Mountain was chosen for the honor. Plans were commissioned from famed architect Frederick Law Olmsted, the designer of Central Park in New York City, to create a naturalistic resort park for the area public to enjoy. Although the area for the original Lookout Mountain Park, as it became commonly known, was acquired by the syndicate, little manmade construction took place since finances were stymied by the Silver Crash of 1893. After languishing due to this and the deaths of its aging stockholders, Lookout Mountain Park was acquired by businessman Rees Vidler, who constructed a funicular incline railway to the top along with other attractions.

== Denver's Park ==
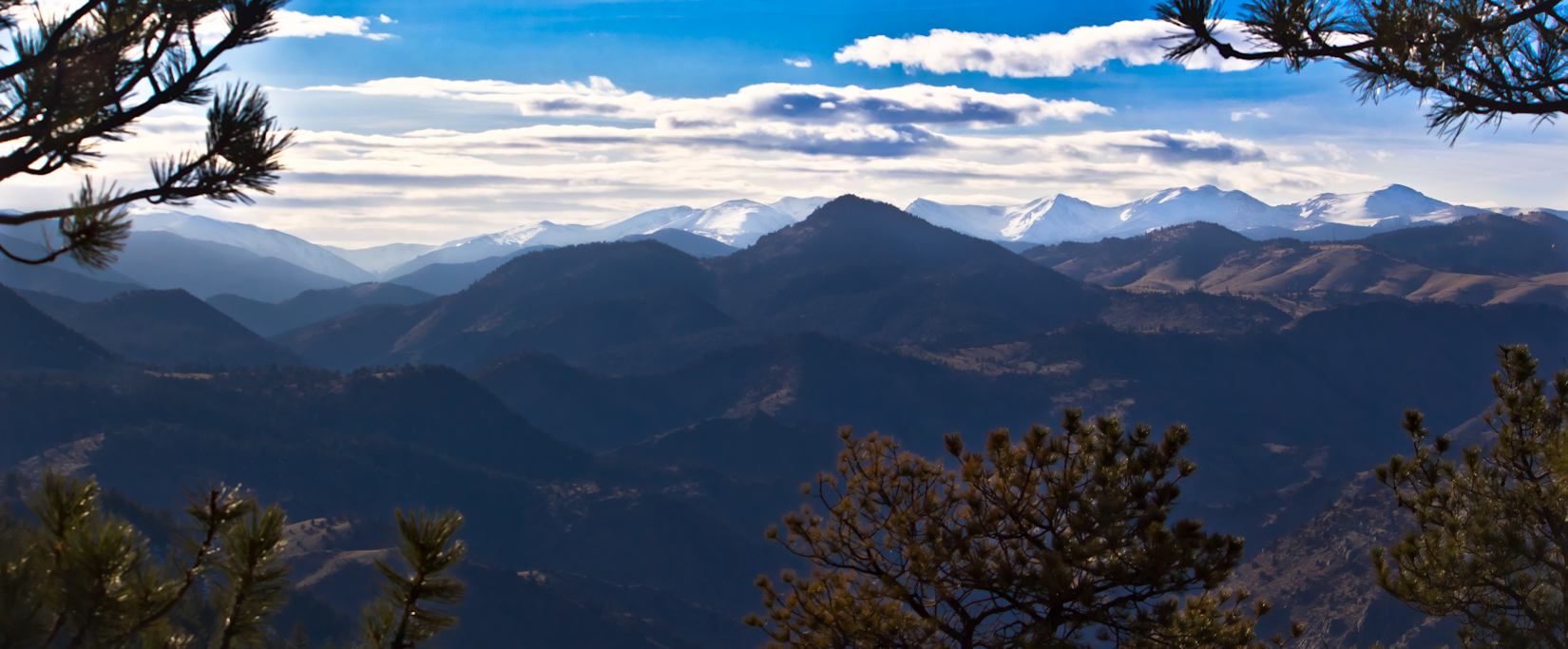
View from Lookout Mountain looking west into the Rockies

With the advent of the Denver Mountain Parks system, Lookout Mountain was quickly eyed by the city, whose efforts were led by Mayor Robert W. Speer who earlier sat on the board of Lookout Mountain Park during the early efforts. In 1917 a portion of what earlier was Lookout Mountain Park was acquired by Denver, which became the new Lookout Mountain Park for Denver. After existing briefly side by side, the bankrupt remaining original park passed by the wayside and Denver's park has been popularly known as Lookout Mountain Park. Since then much of the area of the original park has been reacquired for park purposes as part of Jefferson County Open Space.

== Buffalo Bill ==
"Buffalo Bill" Cody, who spent his final years living in Denver, was buried at Lookout Mountain Park on June 3, 1917. It is disputed whether Cody was buried here by his own request or by coercion, and it is not known if the exact site was chosen by his sister. In 1921, the gravesite was joined by Pahaska Tepee, a large and rustic wooden lodge designed by Edwin H. Moorman, housing the Buffalo Bill Museum. The museum continues to host visitors from around the world, a testament to Buffalo Bill's global appeal even a century after his Wild West exhibition last performed.

== See also ==
- Colorow Point Park, an overlook park on Lookout Mountain
- National Register of Historic Places listings in Jefferson County, Colorado
