= Channel 76 =

Channel 76 was removed from television use in 1983, but was formerly used by television stations in North America which broadcast on 842-848 MHz. In the United States, channels 70-83 were rarely used and served primarily as a "translator band" containing low-power repeater transmitters to fill gaps in coverage for existing stations. Many are defunct; the rest have moved to other frequencies:

- The Midwest Program on Airborne Television Instruction (MPATI) had used UHF channels 72 & 76 (KS2XGA and KS2XGD, respectively) on an experimental basis in stratocasting operation from 1961-1967. The project was abandoned as the cost was prohibitive.
- CBLFT (Radio-Canada) rebroadcaster CBLFT-8 Kitchener, Ontario moved to channel 61 in 1983, reducing power to 635 watts in 2011. All CBC/Radio-Canada rebroadcasters went dark August 31, 2012.
- KCBS-TV (CBS Los Angeles) rebroadcaster K76AJ 29 Palms, California moved to K49DC channel 49.
- KTVX-TV (ABC Salt Lake City) rebroadcaster K76CI Price, Utah moved to K04IW channel 4.
- KEZI (ABC Eugene) rebroadcaster K76AY Florence, Oregon was moved to K56DL channel 56.
- KGW-TV (NBC Portland) rebroadcaster K76AM Tillamook, Oregon moved to K40EG channel 40.
- KHQ-TV (NBC Spokane) rebroadcaster K76AH Lewiston, Idaho moved to K35BW channel 35 (now K35BW-D).
- KOAT-TV (ABC Albuquerque) rebroadcasters K76AS Tucumcari, New Mexico and K76BE Truth or Consequences, New Mexico have been moved to K42CR channel 42 and K64CG channel 64.
- KOLO-TV (ABC Reno) rebroadcaster K76AB Winnemucca, Nevada moved to K47CH channel 47.
- KPTV-TV (Fox Portland) rebroadcasters K76AA Prineville, Oregon and K76CT Hood River, Oregon have been moved to K44AH channel 44 and K28CQ channel 28.
- KSL-TV (NBC Salt Lake City) rebroadcaster K76BN Logan, Utah was moved to K47HW channel 47.
- KUED-TV (PBS Salt Lake City) rebroadcaster K76BM Fillmore, Utah moved to K48ED channel 48.
- WCVE-TV (PBS Richmond) rebroadcaster W76AE Rustburg, Virginia has moved to W60BM channel 60.
- WHO-TV (NBC Des Moines) rebroadcaster K76BZ Ottumwa, Iowa moved to K27CV channel 27.
- WVIA-TV (PBS Scranton) rebroadcaster W76AH Clarks Summit, Pennsylvania was moved to W48AQ channel 48.
