= Channel 73 =

Channel 73 was formerly used by a handful of television stations in North America which broadcast on 824-830 MHz. It was removed from television use in 1983 and the frequencies reassigned to analog mobile telephony.

As higher frequencies were less able to diffract around terrestrial obstacles, very few stations originated on channel 73. The channel was available when the UHF TV band opened in 1953, but the few who did use UHF 73 initially soon moved to lower frequencies or went dark:

- WFMJ-TV (NBC Youngstown) was launched on March 8, 1953, on channel 73. The station moved to its current channel, 21, on August 7, 1954.
- WLOK-TV (NBC Lima, Ohio) broadcast on channel 73 from April 18, 1953, until December 8, 1954. On April 24, 1955, the station became WIMA-TV, moving to channel 35. It is now WLIO, digital VHF 8.
- WTVU 73 in Scranton, Pennsylvania originally broadcast from August 17, 1953, to July 1, 1955 (1kW TPO) as an independent and (very briefly) as a DuMont affiliate; it is no longer operational.

For much of the history of UHF TV broadcasting in the United States, channel 70–83 served primarily as a "translator band" for repeater transmitters filling gaps in coverage for existing stations:

- KTVX-TV (ABC Salt Lake City) rebroadcaster K73BE Logan, Utah moved to K45GL channel 45.
- KWGN-TV (CW Denver) rebroadcaster K73AF Rawlins, Wyoming moved to K56AV channel 56.
- KKTV (CBS Colorado Springs) rebroadcaster K73BV Springfield, Colorado moved to K66CW channel 66.
- KNME-TV (PBS Albuquerque) rebroadcaster K73AL Truth or Consequences, New Mexico moved to K17BH channel 17.
- KOAT-TV (ABC Albuquerque) rebroadcaster K73CG Alamogordo, New Mexico moved to K34CR channel 34.
- KOCO-TV (ABC Oklahoma City) rebroadcaster K73BJ Mooreland, Oklahoma moved to K63CF channel 63.
- KSAZ-TV (Fox Phoenix) rebroadcaster K73CD Flagstaff, Arizona moved to K48GI channel 48.
- KREM-TV (CBS Spokane) rebroadcaster K73AP Quincy, Washington moved to K21AJ channel 21.
- KTCA-TV (PBS Minneapolis-St. Paul) rebroadcaster K73AI Redwood Falls, Minnesota moved to W64AC channel 64.
- KVAL-TV (CBS Eugene) rebroadcaster K73AQ Florence, Oregon moved to K58CW channel 58.
- KVII-TV (ABC Amarillo) rebroadcaster K73BK Gruver, Texas moved to K42CF channel 42.
- KXLY-TV (ABC Spokane) rebroadcaster K73BA East Wenatchee, Washington moved to K53DN channel 53.
- WITF-TV (PBS Harrisburg) rebroadcaster W73AH Chambersburg, Pennsylvania moved to W38AN channel 38.
- WNEP-TV (ABC Scranton) rebroadcaster W73AC Clarks Summit, Pennsylvania moved to W14CO channel 14.

In Auburn, Indiana, 3ABN affiliate W26DH-D formerly numbered its digital subchannels in a 73.x virtual channel pattern; the station had no ties to the historical UHF channel 73. W26DH-D is now using 26 as its virtual channel.
