= Channel 72 =

Channel 72 was removed from television use in 1983, but was formerly used by television stations in North America which broadcast on 818-824 MHz. In the United States, channels 70-83 served primarily as a "translator band" containing repeater transmitters to fill gaps in coverage for existing stations:

- The Midwest Program on Airborne Television Instruction (MPATI) had used UHF channels 72 & 76 (KS2XGA and KS2XGD, respectively) on an experimental basis in stratocasting operation from 1961-1967. The costs involved ultimately proved prohibitive.
- CHBC-TV (Global Kelowna) rebroadcaster CHBC-TV-4 Princeton, British Columbia, then a CBC affiliate; later became CBC-owned CBRG-TV on channel 6, rebroadcasting CBUT Vancouver
- CHBC-TV (Global Kelowna) rebroadcaster CHBC-TV-5 Enderby, British Columbia moved to channel 16.
- KAME-TV (independent in Reno) rebroadcaster K72AA Yerington, Nevada, formerly on channel 72, was moved to K06KC channel 6.
- KENS-TV (CBS San Antonio) rebroadcaster K72DN Leakey, Texas moved to K45FL channel 45.
- KFDA-TV (CBS Amarillo) rebroadcaster K72CB Canadian, Texas was moved to K33CQ channel 33.
- KIRO-TV (CBS Seattle) rebroadcaster K72CI Everett, Washington moved to K58BW channel 58.
- KVBC-TV (NBC Las Vegas) rebroadcaster K72AE Needles, California was moved to K30BQ channel 30.
- KOIN (CBS Portland) rebroadcaster K72AB/K72AY Maupin, Oregon moved to K56CD channel 56.
- KOLO-TV (ABC Reno) rebroadcaster K72AF Battle Mountain, Nevada moved to K13JD channel 13.
- KPAZ-TV (TBN Phoenix) rebroadcaster K72CK Globe, Arizona was moved to K41ER channel 41.
- KREM-TV (CBS Spokane) rebroadcaster K72AI Libby, Montana moved to K62DL channel 62.
- KUED-TV (PBS Salt Lake City) rebroadcasters K72CM Helper, Utah and K72AQ Delta, Utah were moved to K07NS channel 7 and K31FG channel 31 respectively.
- KVII-TV (ABC Amarillo) rebroadcasters K72BZ Childress, Texas and K72CD Clarendon, Texas were moved to K48DD channel 48 (now K16LY-D channel 16) and K49AQ channel 49.
- KXLY-TV (ABC Spokane) rebroadcaster K72CY Lewiston, Idaho moved to K45FZ channel 45.
- WLUK-TV (Fox TV Green Bay) rebroadcaster W72AJ Escanaba, Michigan moved to W40AN channel 40.
- WVIA-TV (PBS Scranton) rebroadcaster W72AT Towanda, Pennsylvania moved to W25AQ channel 25.
