= Channel 71 =

In North America Channel 71 was removed from television use in 1983; it was used by television stations in North America which broadcast on 812-818 MHz. In the United States, channels 70-83 served primarily as a "translator band" containing repeater transmitters to fill gaps in coverage for existing stations:

- WTPA-TV in Harrisburg, Pennsylvania moved from channel 71 to the former DuMont WCMB-TV frequency allocation (channel 27) in 1957. It now operates as WHTM-TV (ABC)
- KAMR-TV (NBC Amarillo) rebroadcaster K71BK Gruver, Texas moved to K38BU channel 38.
- KATU (ABC Portland) rebroadcaster K71AJ Wasco, Oregon moved to K33CJ channel 33.
- KHQ-TV (NBC Spokane) rebroadcaster K71AQ Milton-Freewater, Oregon moved to K40FM channel 40.
- KIMA-TV (CBS Yakima) rebroadcaster K71AA Ellensburg, Washington was moved to K51BD channel 51.
- KOAA-TV (NBC Pueblo) rebroadcaster K71CB Springfield, Colorado was moved to K64CT channel 64.
- KOIN-TV (CBS Portland) rebroadcaster K71AV Florence, Oregon moved to K60DQ channel 60.
- KTVK (ABC Phoenix) rebroadcasters K71AB Blythe, California and K71AD/K71CF Flagstaff, Arizona were moved to K24FA channel 24 and K54GI channel 54 respectively.
- KUED-TV (PBS Salt Lake City) rebroadcaster K71BH Milford, Utah moved to K07GY channel 7.
- KUTV (CBS Salt Lake City) rebroadcaster K71BR Price, Utah was moved to K02OT channel 2
- KVAL-TV (CBS Eugene) rebroadcaster K71AG Cottage Grove, Oregon moved to K58CT channel 58.
