= Channel 74 =

Channel 74 has been removed from television use in 1983, but was formerly used by television stations in North America which broadcast on 830-836 MHz. In the United States, channels 70-83 served primarily as a "translator band" containing repeater transmitters to fill gaps in coverage for existing stations:

- WMGT-TV 74 Adams, Massachusetts later became WCDC-TV channel 19, a rebroadcaster of WTEN-TV Albany, New York. The station’s license was canceled after its spectrum was sold at auction.
- KCCI-TV (CBS Des Moines) rebroadcaster K74CO Ottumwa, Iowa was moved to K23CI channel 23.
- KTVX-TV (ABC Salt Lake City) rebroadcaster K74AO Fillmore, Utah moved to K40GD channel 40.
- KFDA-TV (CBS Amarillo) rebroadcasters K74CH Childress, Texas and K74CJ Clarendon, Texas were moved to K50CQ channel 50 and K51CB channel 51.
- KEZI-TV (ABC Eugene) rebroadcaster K74AJ Cottage Grove, Oregon moved to K56DK channel 56 and later to K42HK-D, digital 42 as part of a group of six local digital repeaters operated by non-profit South Lane Television, Inc.
- KNDO-TV (NBC Yakima) rebroadcaster K74DT Ellensburg, Washington moved to K31AK channel 31.
- KNME-TV (PBS Albuquerque) rebroadcasters K74AZ Gallup, New Mexico and K74BO Santa Rosa, New Mexico were moved to K23FE channel 23 (now K23FE-D) and K30FP channel 30 (now K30FP-D).
- KOB-TV (NBC Albuquerque) rebroadcaster K74AC Bayfield, Colorado moved to K46FM channel 46 (now K21OG-D channel 21).
- KOIN (CBS Portland) rebroadcaster K74BE Hood River, Oregon moved to K53EI channel 53 and later K24KG-D digital 24, operated by Rural Oregon Wireless Television as part of a four-station local repeater cluster.
- KSAZ-TV (Fox Phoenix) rebroadcaster K74AI Flagstaff, Arizona was moved to K48GI channel 48.
- KSNW (NBC Wichita) rebroadcaster K74CN was moved in frequency multiple times, ultimately becoming KSNL-LD channel 47.
- KVBC-TV (NBC Las Vegas) rebroadcaster K74AN Chloride, Arizona moved to K42CQ channel 42 (now K25PJ-D).
- KREM-TV (CBS Spokane) rebroadcaster K74BZ Milton-Freewater, Oregon moved to K51DF channel 51.
- KSAT-TV (ABC San Antonio) rebroadcaster K74DP Leakey, Texas moved to K47GF channel 47.
- KSL-TV (NBC Salt Lake City) rebroadcaster K74DB Little America, Wyoming moved to K29CR channel 29.
- KVII-TV (ABC Amarillo) rebroadcaster K74BF Canadian, Texas was moved to K35CE channel 35 (now K35CE-D).
- KWSU-TV (PBS Pullman) rebroadcaster K74CK Lewiston, Idaho moved to K15CH channel 15 (and eventually to K34QC-D channel 34).
- WCVE-TV (PBS Richmond) rebroadcaster W74AV Rockfish Valley, Virginia was moved to W39AK channel 39.
