= Channel 81 =

Channel 81 has been used to refer to:

- BBC Parliament, a digital television channel on the British Freeview terrestrial service.
- An NTSC-M channel (872-878 MHz) removed from television use in 1983. While no known terrestrial television stations in North America originated on this frequency, channels 70-83 in the United States were employed as a "translator band" of small repeater transmitters rebroadcasting existing stations:
  - KKTV (CBS Pueblo) rebroadcaster K81BG Deora, Colorado moved to K47CJ channel 47.
  - KOB-TV (NBC Albuquerque) rebroadcaster K81BM Carrizozo, New Mexico moved to K51CN channel 51, now defunct.
  - KSAT-TV (ABC San Antonio) rebroadcaster K81BN Camp Wood, Texas moved to K59CJ channel 59, now defunct.
  - KSL-TV (CBS Salt Lake City) rebroadcaster K81BB Price, Utah was moved to K05GX channel 5.
  - KUED-TV (PBS Salt Lake City) rebroadcaster K81BD St. George, Utah moved to K34FS channel 34 and later applied for low-power digital 33.
  - WNNE (NBC Hartford, Vermont) repeater W81AA Lebanon, New Hampshire was moved to W65AM channel 65, now defunct. WNNE itself broadcasts as a semi-satellite of WPTZ-TV Plattsburgh.
