= Channel 5 virtual TV stations in the United States =

The following television stations operate on virtual channel 5 in the United States:

- K02JO-D in Caliente, Nevada
- K03HD-D in Plevna, Montana
- K03IW-D in Cedar Canyon, Utah
- K04RU-D in Long Valley Junction, Utah
- K05AR-D in Rockville, Utah
- K05GA-D in Dolores, Colorado
- K05JW-D in Ismay Canyon, Colorado
- K05KK-D in Poplar, Montana
- K05LI-D in Weber Canyon, Colorado
- K05MR-D in Bullhead City, Arizona
- K07CG-D in Toquerville, Utah
- K07ED-D in Enterprise, Utah
- K07HS-D in Williams, Oregon
- K07IC-D in Malta, Montana
- K07JT-D in Brookings, Oregon
- K07KF-D in Thomasville, Colorado
- K07PZ-D in Cave Junction, Oregon
- K07VA-D in Jordan, Montana
- K08AK-D in Port Orford, etc, Oregon
- K08BO-D in Virgin, Utah
- K08EN-D in Pine Valley, etc., Utah
- K08QG-D in Helper, Utah
- K09BE-D in Ekalaka, Montana
- K09BX-D in Saco, Montana
- K09ZP-D in Sigurd & Salina, Utah
- K09ZQ-D in Marysvale, Utah
- K09ZR-D in Woodland & Kamas, Utah
- K09ZU-D in East Price, Utah
- K09ZW-D in Roosevelt, etc., Utah
- K10BK-D in Big Sandy, Montana
- K10HO-D in Big Piney, etc., Wyoming
- K10RB-D in Mesa, Colorado
- K10RC-D in Denton, Montana
- K10RG-D in Rural Juab County, Utah
- K10RK-D in Blanding/Monticello, Utah
- K10RW-D in Lake Havasu, Arizona
- K11ED-D in Ruth, Nevada
- K11EE-D in Ely & McGill, Nevada
- K11OW-D in Ursine, Nevada
- K11QQ-D in Hildale, etc., Utah
- K12DE-D in Lund & Preston, Nevada
- K12GP-D in Dodson, Montana
- K12MI-D in Laketown, etc., Utah
- K13CP-D in Cedar City, Utah
- K13DU-D in Whitewater, Montana
- K13HA-D in Mink Creek, Idaho
- K13IG-D in Sidney-Fairview, Montana
- K13LN-D in Ekalaka, Montana
- K13MA-D in Scobey, Montana
- K13MI-D in Squaw Valley, etc., Oregon
- K13PU-D in Pioche, Nevada
- K13QY-D in Dingle, etc., Idaho
- K14AG-D in Circle, etc., Montana
- K14KD-D in Frost, Minnesota
- K14KE-D in St. James, Minnesota
- K14NU-D in Beowawe, Nevada
- K14RG-D in Circleville, Utah
- K15AL-D in Winnemucca, Nevada
- K15EE-D in Elko, Nevada
- K15FV-D in Red River, New Mexico
- K15HC-D in Quemado/Pie Town, New Mexico
- K15HD-D in Taos, New Mexico
- K15JO-D in Chama, New Mexico
- K15JV-D in Mexican Hat, Utah
- K15LG-D in Hawthorne, Nevada
- K15LR-D in Meadview, Arizona
- K15LU-D in Eureka, Nevada
- K15LY-D in Ruth, Nevada
- K16CO-D in Alexandria, Minnesota
- K16FV-D in Ryndon, Nevada
- K16GP-D in Circle, Montana
- K16LF-D in Eads, etc., Colorado
- K16LL-D in Cottage Grove, Oregon
- K16MC-D in Rural Sevier County, Utah
- K16MD-D in Teasdale/Torrey, Utah
- K16ME-D in Richfield, etc., Utah
- K16MF-D in Koosharem, Utah
- K16MG-D in Panguitch, Utah
- K16MH-D in Henrieville, Utah
- K16MI-D in Nehpi, Utah
- K16MQ-D in Montezuma Creek & Aneth, Utah
- K16NA-D in Price, Utah
- K16NC-D in Fruitland, Utah
- K17HW-D in Green River, Utah
- K17HX-D in Minersville, Utah
- K17IE-D in Navajo Mountain School, Utah
- K17IF-D in Oljeto, Utah
- K17IH-D in Montezuma Creek-Aneth, Utah
- K17JF-D in Bluff, etc., Utah
- K17JH-D in Mexican Hat, etc., Utah
- K17MO-D in Flagstaff, Arizona
- K17MT-D in Garfield, etc., Utah
- K17MY-D in Jackson, Minnesota
- K17NK-D in Cedar City, Utah
- K17NQ-D in Orangeville, Utah
- K17NW-D in Alexandria, Minnesota
- K18DP-D in Lovelock, Nevada
- K18HR-D in Conchas Dam, New Mexico
- K18HX-D in Hollis, Oklahoma
- K18IU-D in Mayfield, Utah
- K18JE-D in Broadus, Montana
- K18JG-D in Beowawe, Nevada
- K18LG-D in Shiprock, New Mexico
- K18LZ-D in Kingman, Arizona
- K18NA-D in Pahrump, Nevada
- K19BU-D in Pahrump, Nevada
- K19DQ-D in Montpelier, Idaho
- K19DY-D in Canon City, Colorado
- K19FX-D in Laramie, Wyoming
- K19GJ-D in Hatch, Utah
- K19HC-D in Hoehne, Colorado
- K19IH-D in Willmar, Minnesota
- K19IM-D in Duckwater, Nevada
- K19IU-D in Battle Mountain, Nevada
- K19LS-D in Walker Lake, Nevada
- K19ME-D in Overton, Nevada
- K20CV-D in Raton, New Mexico
- K20GJ-D in Bloomington, Utah
- K20JQ-D in Wells, Nevada
- K20KG-D in Pasco, Washington
- K20LF-D in Wendover, Utah
- K20MK-D in Roseburg, Oregon
- K20NC-D in Logan, Utah
- K20OF-D in Malad, Idaho
- K21FT-D in Myton, Utah
- K21FU-D in Topock, Arizona
- K21IC-D in Mount Pleasant, Utah
- K21IN-D in Ridgecrest, etc., California
- K21IT-D in Weatherford, Oklahoma
- K21NN-D in Scipio/Holden, Utah
- K21NO-D in Leamington, Utah
- K21NS-D in Olivia, Minnesota
- K21OV-D in Redstone, Colorado
- K22FN-D in White Oaks, etc., New Mexico
- K22HO-D in Cottage Grove, Oregon
- K22IY-D in Big Piney, Wyoming
- K22JI-D in Huntington, Utah
- K22LE-D in Cedarville, California
- K22MA-D in Elk City, Oklahoma
- K22NG-D in Eureka, Nevada
- K22NP-D in Shiprock, New Mexico
- K22NT-D in Aztec, New Mexico
- K23FC-D in Elko, Nevada
- K23FE-D in Gallup, New Mexico
- K23IC-D in Huntsville, etc., Utah
- K23JU-D in Prosser, Washington
- K23KN-D in Las Animas, Colorado
- K23LX-D in Conrad, Montana
- K23NV-D in Summit County, Utah
- K23OA-D in Kanarraville, Utah
- K23ON-D in Lund & Preston, Nevada
- K23OO-D in Moon Ranch, New Mexico
- K24FE-D in Beaver, etc., Utah
- K24IT-D in Hoquiam, Washington
- K24KU-D in Chinook, Montana
- K24LQ-D in Collbran, Colorado
- K24LX-D in Orderville, Utah
- K24MD-D in Sayre, Oklahoma
- K24MJ-D in Shoshoni, Wyoming
- K24NQ-D in Golconda, Nevada
- K25EN-D in Gold Beach, Oregon
- K25HO-D in Wolf Point, Montana
- K25IW-D in Golconda, Nevada
- K25LJ-D in Tres Piedras, New Mexico
- K25OK-D in Yoncalla, Oregon
- K25PG-D in Strong City, Oklahoma
- K25PU-D in Mina/Luning, Nevada
- K25QB-D in Lucerne Valley, California
- K25QD-D in Tohatchi, New Mexico
- K26IH-D in Manti, etc., Utah
- K26LG-D in Phillips County, Montana
- K26OB-D in Fillmore, etc., Utah
- K26OK-D in Lake Havasu City, Arizona
- K27GC-D in Heber/Midway, Utah
- K27GD-D in Park City, Utah
- K27HJ-D in Pierre, South Dakota
- K27JQ-D in Wolf Point, Montana
- K27JV-D in Kanab, Utah
- K27KS-D in Globe/Miami, Arizona
- K27LT-D in Baker, Montana
- K27MF-D in Orovada, Nevada
- K28EU-D in Laughlin, etc., Nevada
- K28GF-D in Cimarron, New Mexico
- K28GV-D in Tres Piedras, New Mexico
- K28IZ-D in Ely, Nevada
- K28KW-D in Sunnyside, Washington
- K28LL-D in Redwood Falls, Minnesota
- K28NN-D in Wailuku, Hawaii
- K28OB-D in Plentywood, Montana
- K28OE-D in Watertown, South Dakota
- K28OL-D in Loa, etc., Utah
- K29ES-D in Carson City, Nevada
- K29FA-D in Beryl/Modena, etc., Utah
- K29JA-D in Alton, Utah
- K29LM-D in Cottonwood, etc., Arizona
- K29LV-D in Jackson, Minnesota
- K30CN-D in Ely, Nevada
- K30FN-D in St. James, Minnesota
- K30FP-D in Santa Rosa, New Mexico
- K30GG-D in Chloride, Arizona
- K30JD-D in Prescott, Arizona
- K30JM-D in Colorado Springs, Colorado
- K30OP-D in Hanksville, Utah
- K30OW-D in Fishlake Resort, Utah
- K30PB-D in Shurz, Nevada
- K31BM-D in Silver Springs, Nevada
- K31EO-D in Mora, New Mexico
- K31HB-D in Gallina, New Mexico
- K31JR-D in Thoreau, New Mexico
- K31KZ-D in Lakeview, Oregon
- K31LO-D in Eureka, Nevada
- K31MJ-D in Four Buttes, etc., Montana
- K31OQ-D in Grants Pass, Oregon
- K31OR-D in Olivia, Minnesota
- K31OX-D in Ramah, New Mexico
- K31PM-D in Farmington, New Mexico
- K32CA-D in Battle Mountain, Nevada
- K32DY-D in Medford, Oregon
- K32HK-D in Morgan, etc., Utah
- K32HX-D in Duchesne, Utah
- K32IA-D in Manila, etc., Utah
- K32IZ-D in Scofield, Utah
- K32MR-D in Escalante, Utah
- K32NF-D in Spring Glen, Utah
- K33FK-D in Angel Fire, New Mexico
- K33FL-D in Las Vegas, New Mexico
- K33GA-D in Grants/Milan, New Mexico
- K33GC-D in Capulin, etc., New Mexico
- K33GX-D in Springfield, South Dakota
- K33IZ-D in Boulder, Utah
- K33KV-D in Lamar, Colorado
- K33NY-D in Roseburg, Oregon
- K33OE-D in Penasco, New Mexico
- K33OJ-D in Garfield, etc., Utah
- K33OM-D in Caineville, Utah
- K33OX-D in Samak, Utah
- K33PF-D in Beaver, etc., Utah
- K33PG-D in Socorro, New Mexico
- K33PH-D in Garrison, etc., Utah
- K33PI-D in Eureka, Nevada
- K33PM-D in Grants Pass, Oregon
- K33PO-D in Clear Creek, Utah
- K33QC-D in Window Rock, Arizona
- K33QD-D in Zuni Pueblo, New Mexico
- K34FQ-D in Roy, New Mexico
- K34GY-D in Culbertson, Montana
- K34HF-D in Cuba, New Mexico
- K34IW-D in Hanna, etc., Utah
- K34JB-D in Vernal, etc., Utah
- K34KJ-D in Crescent City, etc., California
- K34KK-D in Litchfield, California
- K34KQ-D in Fountain Green, Utah
- K34LN-D in Cheyenne Wells, Colorado
- K34ME-D in Overton, Nevada
- K34NV-D in Frost, Minnesota
- K34OA-D in Capitol Reef National, Utah
- K34OC-D in Antimony, Utah
- K34OD-D in Tropic, etc., Utah
- K34OL-D in Wanship, Utah
- K34OM-D in Henefer, etc., Utah
- K34OW-D in Yreka, California
- K34OX-D in Delta, Oak City, etc., Utah
- K34PB-D in Emery, Utah
- K34PC-D in Green River, Utah
- K34PE-D in Dolan Springs, Arizona
- K34PH-D in Ferron, Utah
- K34PM-D in Joplin, Montana
- K34QJ-D in Panaca, Nevada
- K35FS-D in Santa Clara, etc., Utah
- K35HD-D in Soda Springs, Idaho
- K35IS-D in Peoa/Oakley, Utah
- K35IX-D in Basalt, Colorado
- K35KM-D in Eureka, Nevada
- K35NF-D in Fort Peck, Montana
- K35NY-D in Redwood Falls, Minnesota
- K35PE-D in Snowmass Village, Colorado
- K36AI-D in Parowan/Enoch, etc., Utah
- K36BX-D in Coos Bay, Oregon
- K36FQ-D in Wagon Mound, New Mexico
- K36FS-D in Randolph, Utah
- K36HH-D in Susanville, etc., California
- K36OB-D in Verdi, Nevada
- K36OT-D in Coalville, Utah
- K36PB-D in Lewistown, Montana
- K36PP-D in Farmington, etc., New Mexico
- KALB-TV in Alexandria, Louisiana
- KATH-LD in Juneau-Douglas, Alaska
- KAUU in Anchorage, Alaska
- KCIB-LD in El Dorado, Arkansas
- KCTU-LD in Wichita, Kansas
- KCTV in Kansas City, Missouri
- KDLV-TV in Mitchell, South Dakota
- KENS in San Antonio, Texas
- KEVC-CD in Indio, California
- KFBB-TV in Great Falls, Montana
- KFSM-TV in Fort Smith, Arkansas
- KFYR-TV in Bismarck, North Dakota
- KGMB in Honolulu, Hawaii
- KGWL-TV in Lander, Wyoming
- KGWN-TV in Cheyenne, Wyoming
- KHSD-TV in Lead, South Dakota
- KING-TV in Seattle, Washington
- KLUF-LD in Lufkin, Texas
- KNHL in Hastings, Nebraska
- KNMD-TV in Santa Fe, New Mexico
- KNME-TV in Albuquerque, New Mexico
- KNPB in Reno, Nevada
- KOAA-TV in Pueblo, Colorado
- KOBI in Medford, Oregon
- KOCO-TV in Oklahoma City, Oklahoma
- KPHO-TV in Phoenix, Arizona
- KPIX-TV in San Francisco, California
- KPWC-LD in Tillamook, Oregon
- KRDH-LD in Cripple Creek, etc., Colorado
- KREX-TV in Grand Junction, Colorado
- KRGV-TV in Weslaco, Texas
- KSDK in St. Louis, Missouri
- KSL-TV in Salt Lake City, Utah
- KSTC-TV in Minneapolis, Minnesota
- KSTP-TV in St. Paul, Minnesota
- KTDJ-LD in Dayton, Texas
- KTLA in Los Angeles, California
- KTTZ-TV in Lubbock, Texas
- KVVU-TV in Henderson, Nevada
- KXAS-TV in Fort Worth, Texas
- KXGN-TV in Glendive, Montana
- KYES-LD in Anchorage, Alaska
- KYEX-LD in Juneau, Alaska
- W05BV-D in Starkville, Mississippi
- W05CO-D in Sarasota, Florida
- W05CY-D in Mayaguez, Puerto Rico
- W05DA-D in Fajardo, Puerto Rico
- W05DB-D in Ponce, Puerto Rico
- W09DB-D in Williamsport, Pennsylvania
- W10BG-D in Mayaguez, Puerto Rico
- W19FA-D in Bangor, Maine
- W20DW-D in Clarksdale, Mississippi
- W24ES-D in Moorefield, West Virginia
- W29EE-D in San Lorenzo, Puerto Rico
- WABI-TV in Bangor, Maine
- WAGA-TV in Atlanta, Georgia
- WANF-LD in Dyersburg, Tennessee
- WBKP in Calumet, Michigan
- WBXM-CD in Montgomery, Alabama
- WCSC-TV in Charleston, South Carolina
- WCVB-TV in Boston, Massachusetts
- WCYB-TV in Bristol, Virginia
- WDDY-LD in Jackson, Tennessee
- WDTO-LD in Orlando, Florida
- WDTV in Weston, West Virginia
- WEWS-TV in Cleveland, Ohio
- WFRV-TV in Green Bay, Wisconsin
- WKRG-TV in Mobile, Alabama
- WLWT in Cincinnati, Ohio
- WMAQ-TV in Chicago, Illinois
- WMBE-LD in Myrtle Beach, South Carolina
- WMC-TV in Memphis, Tennessee
- WNEM-TV in Bay City, Michigan
- WNYW in New York, New York
- WOI-DT in Ames, Iowa
- WORA-TV in Mayaguez, Puerto Rico
- WPTV-TV in West Palm Beach, Florida
- WPTZ in Plattsburgh, New York
- WRAL-TV in Raleigh, North Carolina
- WRFB in Carolina, Puerto Rico
- WTMU-LD in Montgomery, Alabama
- WTTG in Washington, D.C.
- WTVF in Nashville, Tennessee
- WTVH in Syracuse, New York
- WUFT in Gainesville, Florida
- WZDS-LD in Evansville, Indiana
- WZPJ-LD in Bennington, Vermont

The following television stations, which are no longer licensed, formerly operated on virtual channel 5 in the United States:

- K04HH-D in Aspen, Colorado
- K05MY-D in Bakersfield, California
- K09XO-D in Homer, Alaska
- K13HU-D in Fort Jones, etc., California
- K23KV-D in Austin, Nevada
- K24CS-D in Granite Falls, Minnesota
- K32HO-D in Fruitland, Utah
- K33BN in Taos, New Mexico
- K33PY-D in Round Mountain, Nevada
- K36OK-D in Granite Falls, Minnesota
- K40GZ-D in Preston, Idaho
- K46FB-D in Austin, Nevada
- K49IL-D in Tecolote, New Mexico
- K49KF-D in Los Alamos/Espanola, New Mexico
- KCEM-LD in Chelan Butte, Washington
- KSXC-LD in South Sioux City, Nebraska
- W30DW-D in Tifton, Georgia
- WXFL-LD in Florence, etc., Alabama
