= Channel 78 =

Former television station code

Channel 78 was removed from television use in 1983, but was formerly used by television stations in North America which broadcast on UHF frequencies 854–860 MHz.

CBEFT's logo as "U78", on Channel 78.

There was one full-power originating station on this frequency in Canada. CBEFT (Radio-Canada Windsor) first aired on Channel 78 in 1976, moving to channel 54 in 1982. By 1996, the station had become a simple rebroadcaster of CBOFT Ottawa–Hull. Later a CBLFT rebroadcaster, it had been moved to channel 35 due to the reassignment of UHF TV channels 52–69 to mobile telephony in 2009; it remained full-power analogue until closing down (along with all of CBC/Radio Canada's rebroadcasters) in 2012.

In the United States, channels 70–83 had served primarily as a "translator band" containing repeater transmitters to fill gaps in coverage for existing stations. These transmitters were forced to change frequency repeatedly, as stations which had moved from 70–83 due to the 1983 introduction of analogue mobile telephony typically had to move again by 2011 due to the loss of UHF TV channels 52–69 to cell phones. While as low-power television stations these were not required to convert to digital operation on the 2009 US transition date, most were adversely affected by the upstream full-power stations conversion. Many have gone silent.

- WTTW (PBS Chicago) operated a channel 78 repeater from 1964 to 1972, now defunct. Coverage is now provided directly by the main transmitters for the two Chicago PBS member stations (channels 11 and 20), housed at the Sears Tower upon its completion in 1973.
- KATU-TV (ABC Portland, Oregon) rebroadcaster K78AU Maupin, Oregon moved to K54BK channel 54 and will relocate to digital channel 17.
- KCBD (NBC Lubbock) rebroadcaster K78AZ Matador, Texas had moved to K40FK channel 40. It is no longer in operation.
- KECI-TV (NBC Missoula) rebroadcaster K78CG Salmon, Idaho moved to K65BG channel 65; it is now digital channel 30 as K30PW-D.
- KHQ-TV (NBC Spokane) rebroadcaster K78AI Libby, Montana moved to K66DR channel 66 and will move to digital channel 26.
- KIIN-TV (PBS Johnston, Iowa) rebroadcaster K78CR Keosauqua, Iowa moved to K54AF channel 54; it is currently digital channel 24.
- KIRO-TV (CBS Seattle) rebroadcaster K78BM Point Pulley, Washington moved to K67GJ channel 67; it is now digital channel 18.
- KOAT-TV (ABC Albuquerque) rebroadcaster K78AS Santa Rosa, New Mexico moved to K64DV channel 64; it is no longer in operation.
- KOCO-TV (ABC Oklahoma City) rebroadcaster K78BK Seiling, Oklahoma had moved to K55EZ channel 55. Rebroadcasters for this region have been moved to digital channels K19GZ-D, K41KS-D, K43KU-D, K47LB-D and K49DO-D, all operated by KFOR-TV.
- KSL-TV (NBC Salt Lake City) rebroadcasters K78AF La Barge, Wyoming and K78BF Preston, Idaho have been moved to K02GE channel 2 and K33GF channel 33 (now K33GF-D).
- KTVK (Phoenix) rebroadcaster K78AC Kingman, Arizona moved to K23FV channel 23 (now K23FV-D).
- KTVX-TV (ABC Salt Lake City) rebroadcaster K78AA Castle Dale, Utah moved to K32FR channel 32, now digital channel 38.
- KUTV (CBS Salt Lake City) rebroadcaster K78BG Myton, Utah has moved to K41GT channel 41 (now defunct).

== Use of Channel 78 by U.S. Military during Vietnam War ==
From 1962 until the Fall of Saigon on April 30, 1975, the United States Military operated the American Forces Vietnam Network relaying its programming from the main AFVN broadcast facilities in Saigon to the Channel 78 transmitter in Cần Thơ.
