= Channel 75 =

Channel 75, removed from television use in 1983, was formerly used by television stations in North America which broadcast on UHF frequencies 836-842 MHz. In the United States, channels 70-83 served primarily as a "translator band" containing repeater transmitters to fill gaps in coverage for existing stations. A handful remained in licensed operation in remote locations for years after the frequencies were lost to AMPS cellular telephony and the channels removed from tuners on new televisions, often running unattended and unmonitored.

Many of these tiny rebroadcasters have left the air; those which remain were moved to lower channels after 1983, typically to channels which required they move again when UHF TV channels 52-69 were lost in 2009-2011.

In Canada, the frequency was assigned to a small rebroadcast transmitter serving one tiny village Clermont, Québec on La Malbaie where terrestrial obstacles blocked the main signal. CFCM-TV (Québec) rebroadcaster CJVC-TV operated from 1958 to the mid-1960s. CFCM, a Radio-Canada affiliate at the time (1954-1964), later became a TVA station. The channel 75 transmitter was replaced by CJBR-TV (Radio-Canada Rimouski) rebroadcaster CFCV-TV Clermont, Québec in the mid-1960s to retain Radio-Canada programming. CFCV was replaced by ten-watt CBSAT channel 21, then went dark as all CBC/Radio-Canada owned and operated rebroadcasters were shut down nationally on August 1, 2012.

All other assignments have been to low-power rebroadcasters of US stations:

- KBJR-TV (NBC Duluth) rebroadcaster K75AQ Kabetogama, Minnesota moved to K67EH channel 67; it is now K34LJ-D digital channel 34.
- KTVX-TV (ABC Salt Lake City) rebroadcaster K75AY Myton, Utah moved to K19EY channel 19 (now K19EY-D).
- KFDA-TV (CBS Amarillo) rebroadcaster K75BN Gruver, Texas moved to K44CC channel 44 (now K44CC-D).
- KGW-TV (NBC Portland) rebroadcasters K75AK Wasco, Oregon and K75AU Maupin, Oregon were moved to K41CL channel 41 and K58BU channel 58 (both now defunct).
- KHQ-TV (NBC Spokane) rebroadcaster K75BB East Wenatchee, Washington moved to K55FO channel 55, operated by the Apple Valley TV Association (a local group which operates KWCC-LD 47). That group currently holds a license for K51DR-D (digital 51, Wenatchee).
- KRDO-TV (ABC Colorado Springs) rebroadcaster K75CF Springfield, Colorado moved to K68CR channel 68 (now defunct).
- KSL-TV (NBC Salt Lake City) rebroadcaster K75AB Roosevelt, Utah is now K08CS channel 8, one of multiple county-owned broadcast translators in the area.
- KTSC-TV (PBS Denver) rebroadcaster K75CV Waunita Hot Springs, Colorado moved to K51DI channel 51. K51DI-D is now operated by the Gunnison County Municipal Recreation District, licensed to Sargents, Colorado. See Rocky Mountain PBS#KTSC translators.
- KUTV-TV (CBS Salt Lake City) rebroadcasters K75AF Ely, Nevada and K75BW Aurora, Utah were moved to K32CJ channel 32 and K53CF channel 53 respectively. KUTV's Aurora transmitter is now K50KG-D channel 50.
- KWTV-TV (CBS Oklahoma City) rebroadcaster K75BM Mooreland, Oklahoma moved to K65CO channel 65. (defunct, KFOR-owned K33JM-D is now the only Mooreland transmitter)
- KXLY-TV (ABC Spokane) rebroadcaster K75AA Chelan, Washington moved to K03DI channel 3.
- WVPT (PBS Harrisonburg) rebroadcaster W75AL Luray, Virginia moved to W38AV channel 38.
- KTVQ (Billings, Montana) rebroadcaster K75CL Forsyth was the last broadcast transmitter licensed on this frequency in North America; it seems to have disappeared sometime in the late 1990s, with the licence deleted soon after the end of 1999.

In Australia the Seven Network broadcasts Openshop on this virtual channel. The channel launched on August 1 2019 and ceased broadcasting on September 7 2021.
