= Impression of Youth =

2025 Taiwanese television series

- Chinese: 印象·青春
- Genre: Boys' love; Romantic drama
- Screenplay by: Lin Wei Jie
- Directed by: Eri Hao
- Starring: Muji Hsu; Andrew Chien; Wish Chu; Will Wen
- Country of origin: Taiwan
- Original language: Mandarin
- No. of episodes: 9

Production
- Executive producer: Andy Chen
- Producer: Erics Production
- Running time: 28 minutes

Original release
- Network: KKTV, iQIYI, Viki
- Release: 15 January – 5 March 2025

Impression of Youth (印象·青春) is a Taiwanese boys' love romantic drama television series directed by Eri Hao and written by Lin Wei Jie. Starring Muji Hsu, Andrew Chien, Wish Chu and Will Wen, the series follows the relationship between an art graduate student working as a substitute teacher and a talented high school student who dreams of becoming an artist.

The series premiered on KKTV on 15 January 2025 and aired weekly until 5 March 2025 for a total of nine episodes. It was also released internationally through iQIYI, Viki and Apple TV.

== Synopsis ==
Yu Xing is an art graduate student whose final project is rejected by his professor. Hoping to rediscover his artistic inspiration, he accepts an assignment as a substitute teacher at a rural high school for one month.

There, he meets Xu Lu Hui, a cheerful and talented student who dreams of becoming an artist but has few opportunities to develop his skills. Although the two initially clash, they eventually reach an agreement: Lu Hui will take Yu Xing to scenic locations suitable for painting, while Yu Xing will provide him with private art lessons after school.

As the two spend more time together, their mentor student relationship gradually develops into a forbidden romance, forcing them to confront personal expectations, social boundaries and the consequences of their growing feelings.

== Cast ==
=== Main ===
- Muji Hsu as Yu Xing
- Andrew Chien as Xu Lu Hui
- Wish Chu as Ye Bing Chen
- Will Wen as Xu Lu Xi

=== Recurring ===
- Liu Hao Wen as Xiao Lu
- Tiffany Lin as Xiao Yue
- Chen Yv Hao as A Yuan
- Tang Yv as Lan Xin, Ye Bing Chen's late wife

=== Guest ===
- Marcus Chang as the fine arts teacher (episodes 1, 2 and 9)
- Andy Chen as a bar owner (episodes 3, 7 and 8)
- Ryan Kuo as Professor Liang Chen (episode 9)

== Production ==
Impression of Youth was directed by Eri Hao from a screenplay by Lin Wei Jie, with Andy Chen serving as executive producer. The series was produced by Erics Production in collaboration with KKTV, Fandor Pictures, Then Becoming Light Media and Da Teng Entertainment.

The series premiered on KKTV on 15 January 2025 and was simultaneously released through iQIYI International, Viki, Rakuten TV and other streaming platforms in more than twenty territories.

In March 2025, the principal cast appeared on TVBS's T TALK, where they discussed the series' themes of grief, healing and personal growth. During the interview, Muji Hsu and Wish Chu shared personal experiences with loss and explained how those experiences influenced their performances.
