= Channel 82 =

Defunct North American Channel Number

Channel 82 was removed from television use in 1983. The second-highest frequency to have been used for NTSC-M terrestrial TV broadcasting, it was formerly used by a handful of television stations in North America which broadcast on 878-884 MHz. In the United States, channels 70-83 served primarily as a "translator band" for repeater transmitters filling gaps in coverage for existing stations:

- KG2XEL Emporium, Pennsylvania, the first experimental 10-watt signal on this channel (1953), rebroadcast WJAC-TV Johnstown in order to circumvent hills which posed local obstacles to the main WJAC signal.
- KATU (ABC Portland) rebroadcaster K82AT Tillamook, Oregon, formerly on this channel, has moved to K43EJ channel 43.
- KBJR (NBC Duluth) rebroadcaster K82AJ International Falls, Minnesota moved to K60BT channel 60.
- KRQE (CBS Albuquerque) rebroadcasters K82AC Romeo, Colorado and K82AR Durango, Colorado were moved to K45GD channel 45 and K31FV channel 31.
- KFOR-TV (NBC Oklahoma City) rebroadcaster K82BB Seiling, Oklahoma has been moved to K53CI channel 53.
- KESQ-TV (ABC Palm Springs) rebroadcaster K82BQ Hemet, California was used in the 1980s.
