= Nightmare Theater (TV series) =

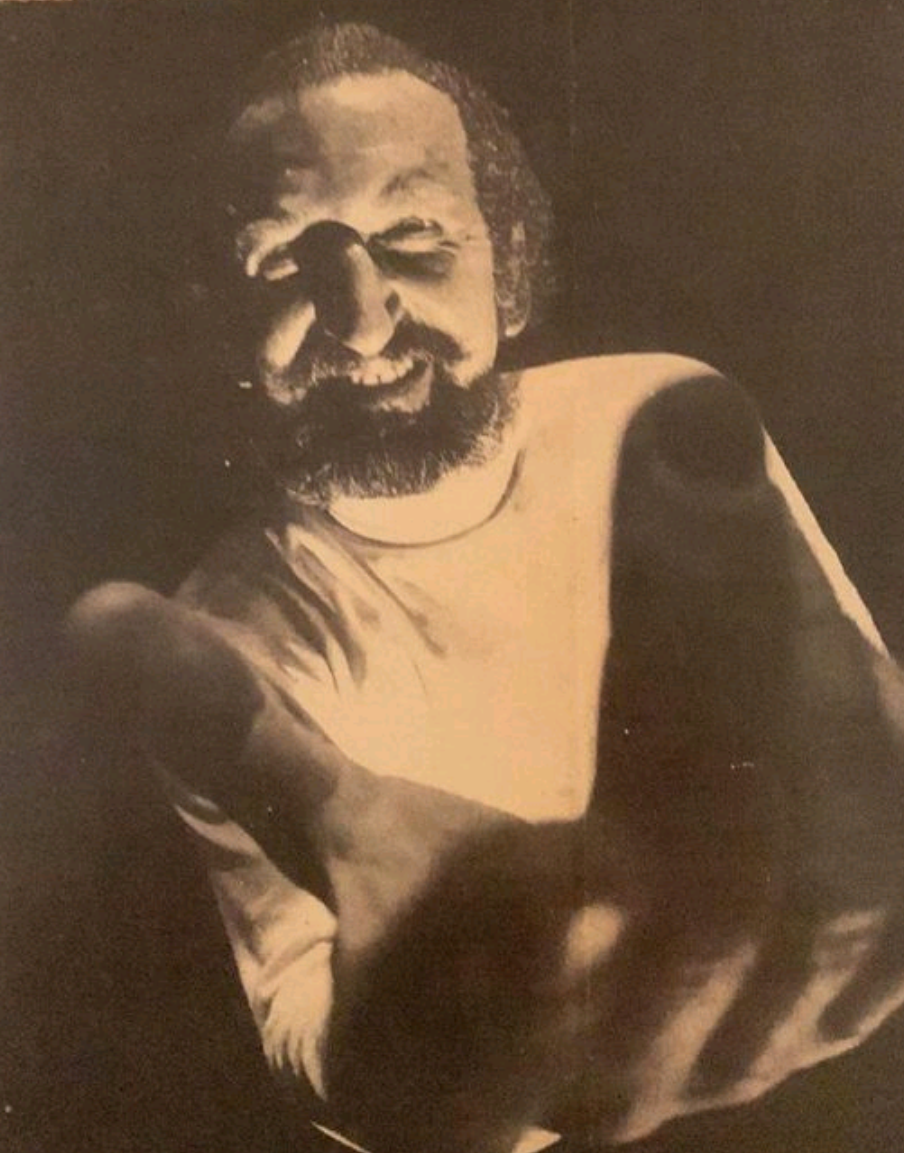
- Ron Ross Nightmare Theater (Utah) promotional photo
- Genre: Horror film; Anthology series
- Country of origin: United States

Production
- Running time: 2 hours

Original release
- Network: KCPX
- Release: September 28, 1962 – October 16, 1982

Nightmare Theater is an American late-night horror television program that was broadcast on KCPX (channel 4, now KTVX) in Salt Lake City, Utah, from 1962 until 1982. The show first aired at 10:35 p.m. on September 28, 1962, with a showing of Attack of the 50 Foot Woman. It was one of Utah's most popular and longest running shows. Nightmare Theater did not have a host, except for a short period in 1973. Very little documentation aside from newspaper ads is known to exist, except a few photographs of the opening credits, some audio recordings of the introduction, and memorabilia saved by Ron Ross, who would do the introductory voiceover starting in 1965.

== History ==
=== Title ===
Originally the show was simply titled Nightmare with Theater not added until 1963 and initially spelled inconsistently, with both the British spelling theatre and the American spelling theater being used, although Theater became the preferred spelling.

=== Background ===
Nightmare Theater was not the first late night horror program in Salt Lake City. In 1958–59, Roderick, played by Jack Whittaker, hosted Shock Theater, a show broadcasting classic Universal monster movies supplied by a popular nationwide syndication package.

The success of Nightmare Theater brought immediate competition. On November 23, 1962, Roderick's Towers started on KSL-TV (channel 5), featuring Jack Whitaker reprising his role as Roderick from 1957's Shock Theater. The show was short lived, lasting until May 22, 1964. On January 12, 1968, KSL again launched a competing show, Double Frightmare Theater. That show lasted until August 1969. Nightmare Theater also faced constant competition from talk shows. In April 1967, the second feature was replaced by The Joey Bishop Show. However, Joey Bishop was quickly moved to Sunday. Howard Pearson, the Deseret News television editor, notes in his April 28 article that Double Nightmare Theater would be reinstated because of its popularity. In 1975, parts of Salt Lake City began to be wired for cable TV. One of the new channels was KTVU from San Francisco with the popular Creature Features hosted by Bob Wilkins.

=== Content ===
Unlike similar shows in other cities, Salt Lake's Nightmare Theater had no long-running host to introduce the films. In 1965, popular local icon Ron Ross began voiceover introductions, which lasted until 1971. One recording of the show's introduction is known to exist. Ross was well known in the community, primarily as children's show host Fireman Frank. Salt Lake Tribune television editor Harold Schindler discussed the arrival of a new package of horror films as well as the show's popularity in a 1967 column. On August 2, 1973, Nightmare Theater received its only host, Dr. Volapuc. Alternative spellings include Volupuc, Volupuk, Volapuk, and Volapuc. Dr. Volapuc was short-lived, introducing a run of classic Universal monster films during his six-month stint. No photos of the host are known to exist. Often incorrectly noted as being played by Ron Ross, Dr. Volapuc was Larry John, known for playing Cannonball in the series Hotel Balderdash. John was paid $50 per Nightmare Theater appearance. His shows ended with a reminder Volapuc backwards was "Cup a Love".

=== End ===
The exact end date of Salt Lake City's Nightmare Theater is nebulous. October 16, 1982, is the last time it is listed by KCPX. The film shown was Invasion from Inner Earth. However, genre films occupied the time slot thru the end of 1982 and until March 19, 1983. Additionally, beginning October 23, 1982 (a week after the last listing), the Salt Lake Tribune stopped listing film slot titles for all films on every channel. The final genre film in the time slot was Star Pilot. The next week a rock and roll show occupied the time slot.
