= KZCS-LD =

Television station in Colorado Springs, Colorado

- Colorado Springs, Colorado; United States
- Channels: Digital: 18 (UHF); Virtual: 18

Programming
- Affiliations: 18.1: Ion Mystery; for others, see § Subchannels

Ownership
- Owner: E. W. Scripps Company; (Scripps Broadcasting Holdings LLC)
- Sister stations: KKTV; KOAA-TV

History
- First air date: May 6, 1994
- Former call signs: K38DM (1994–2003); K23GJ (2003–2005); KZCS-LP (2005–2020)
- Former channel number: Analog: 38 (UHF, 1994–2003), 23 (UHF, 2003–2020)
- Former affiliations: CBS (via KMGH-TV, 1994–1995); ABC (via KMGH-TV, 1995–2013); Azteca América (2013–2019)
- Call sign meaning: Azteca Colorado Springs (former affiliation)

Technical information
- Licensing authority: FCC
- Facility ID: 67544
- Class: LD
- ERP: 15 kW
- HAAT: 659.1 m (2,162 ft)
- Transmitter coordinates: 38°44′38.9″N 104°51′47.7″W

Links
- Public license information: LMS

KZCS-LD (channel 18) is a low-power television station in Colorado Springs, Colorado, United States, airing programming from the digital multicast network Ion Mystery. It is owned by the E. W. Scripps Company alongside Pueblo-licensed NBC affiliate KOAA-TV (channel 5) & Colorado Springs-licensed CBS affiliate KKTV (channel 11). KZCS-LD's transmitter is located on Cheyenne Mountain. Master control and most internal operations are based at the studios of ABC affiliate KMGH-TV (channel 7) on Delgany Street in Denver's River North Art District. (Note: The Federal Communications Commission (FCC) considers KMGH-TV as the parent license of KZCS-LD.)

== History ==
The station signed on the air in 1994 on analog channel 38 as K38DM, a translator of KMGH-TV, then a CBS affiliate. It moved to channel 23 in 2003, changing its call sign to K23GJ. It assumed the KZCS-LP call sign in 2005, and became an Azteca América affiliate in 2013, relaying KMGH-TV's second digital subchannel. It switched to Escape (which later rebranded to Court TV Mystery, now Ion Mystery since 2022) in 2019, and flash-cut to digital in 2020.

== Subchannels ==
The station's signal is multiplexed:

Subchannels of KZCS-LD
Subchannel	Res.	Short name	Programming
18.1	480i	Mystery	Ion Mystery
18.2	480i	Bounce	Bounce TV
18.3	480i	DEFY	Defy
18.4	480i	GameSho	Game Show Central
18.5	480i	QVC2	QVC2
