= George Fischbeck =

American weather presenter (1922–2015)

- Dr. George delivering the weather, 1980
- Born: July 1, 1922; Wallington, New Jersey, US
- Died: March 25, 2015 (aged 92); Woodland Hills, California, US
- Spouse: Susanne Fischbeck (m. 1949–2015)
- Children: 2
- Presenting career
- Stations: Albuquerque: KNME-TV (1960-1970); KOB-TV (1970-1972); Los Angeles: KABC-TV (1972-1992); KCBS-TV (1994-1997)
- Style: Weatherman

George Richard Fischbeck (July 1, 1922 – March 25, 2015) was an American television weatherman on KOB-TV in Albuquerque, New Mexico, from the early 1960s to early 1970s. In 1972 he moved to KABC-TV in Los Angeles, replacing Alan Sloane, where he became a staple on the station's Eyewitness News broadcasts. He would retire from KABC-TV in 1992, but returned to television with a brief stint at KCBS-TV from 1994 to 1997.

== Early life and career ==
Fischbeck was born in Wallington, New Jersey, and grew up working on the family farm in Farmingdale, New Jersey, the son of Johanna (Mohlenhoff), a teacher, and George Stelling Fischbeck, a farmer. He attended Freehold High School, graduating at the age of 16 before starting, and shortly thereafter dropping out of, Rutgers University.

On March 22, 1943, Fischbeck enlisted in the United States Army Reserve as a private first class and was initially stationed at Fort Dix, New Jersey. He then was stationed in Hawaii, where he worked as a tank mechanic and became a corporal. He later worked with the New Mexico Air National Guard during the Korean War, and began learning basic meteorology. While in the New Mexico Air National Guard, he was stationed at Kirtland Air Force Base in Albuquerque and was assigned to the 188th Fighter Squadron.

He studied education while attending the University of New Mexico, graduating in 1955 with a Master of Arts. Fischbeck worked as an Albuquerque–based teacher for 23 years, which helped him develop an "ebullient" personality. The "Dr" referred to an honorary doctorate given at the now-defunct University of Albuquerque.

== Television career ==
His unique, sometimes humorous forecasts were unscripted and often turned into an opportunity to educate his viewers on the subject of weather. He started his television career at KNME-TV in Albuquerque as a host of a children's science program. In 1979 he was awarded the Silver Beaver by the Boy Scouts of America for his service to youth. After his move to California, Fischbeck appeared in a simulated news broadcast as part of an earthquake simulation exhibit at the California Museum of Science and Industry. In 2003, he was awarded the Los Angeles Area Governors Award for lifetime achievement by the Academy of Television Arts & Sciences for special and unique contributions to Los Angeles area television. In 2013, Los Angeles City Councilman Tom LaBonge declared April 10 to be Dr. George Day in the city. A month later, Fischbeck's autobiography was published by the University of New Mexico Press. Fischbeck died on March 25, 2015, in Woodland Hills, California.

== Personal life ==
Fischbeck was an amateur radio operator, and carried the call sign KE6SBY.

He married Susanne Fischbeck in 1949, with whom he had brother and sister fraternal twins. The daughter is Nancy. His son died at an early age, circa (1976).

For more than twenty years Fischbeck worked as a member of the Los Angeles Police Department's Volunteer Surveillance Team. In retirement, he continued that work and was also a volunteer with the Los Angeles Zoo In September 2015, the LAPD named their outstanding Volunteer Surveillance Team member award the "Dr. George Fischbeck Memorial Award" in his honor.

At the end of Tom Waits' comic song "Emotional Weather Report" (from his 1975 album Nighthawks at the Diner), he quips, "Dr. George Fischbeck ain't got nothin' on me!" Mark Jonathan Davis recorded a parody of Mötley Crüe's "Dr. Feelgood" called "Dr. Fischbeck" about the weatherman.

He died on March 25, 2015.
