= KNMD-TV =

Television station in Santa Fe, New Mexico

ATSC 3.0 station
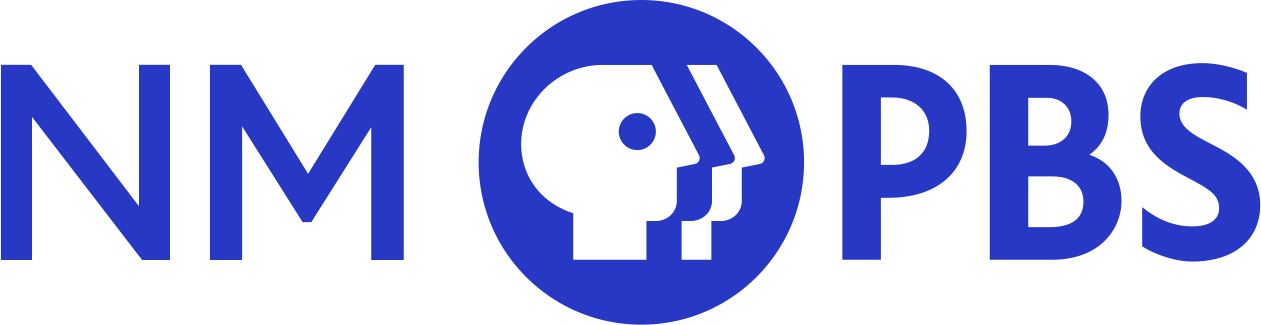
- Santa Fe–Albuquerque, New Mexico; United States
- City: Santa Fe, New Mexico
- Channels: Digital: 8 (VHF); Virtual: 5
- Branding: NM PBS

Programming
- Affiliations: see § Subchannels

Ownership
- Owner: University of New Mexico; (The Regents of the University of New Mexico)
- Sister stations: KNME-TV

History
- First air date: 2004
- Former channel numbers: Digital: 9 (VHF, 2004–2010); Virtual: 9 (2004–2021)
- Former affiliations: PBS (2004–2009); World Channel (2009–2021)
- Call sign meaning: New Mexico Digital

Technical information
- Licensing authority: FCC
- Facility ID: 84215
- ERP: 16.6 kW
- HAAT: 1,274 m (4,180 ft)
- Transmitter coordinates: 35°12′44.1″N 106°26′59″W

Links
- Public license information: Public file; LMS
- Website: www.newmexicopbs.org

KNMD-TV (channel 5) is an ATSC 3.0 PBS member television station licensed to Santa Fe, New Mexico, United States, serving the Albuquerque area. Owned by the University of New Mexico, it is a sister station to Albuquerque-licensed KNME-TV (channel 5). The two stations share studios on UNM's North Campus on University Boulevard Northeast in Albuquerque; KNMD-TV's transmitter is located atop Sandia Crest.

== History ==
KNMD began broadcasting in late 2004 on VHF channel 9. It was launched as an exclusively digital television station and is the first and only station in the Albuquerque market to have never broadcast in analog.

=== Signal issues ===
Broadcasting at only 200 watts, KNMD's signal was sometimes hard to pick up in many areas without pixelation and choppy sound. KNMD was not licensed as a low-power TV station but originally used low power because of interference issues with KCHF which broadcast its digital signal on channel 10 from a site near Los Alamos, New Mexico. KNMD filed an application with the FCC in 2009 to move transmission frequency to channel 8 and increase power to 5.14 kW in order to improve its signal quality and range. They were granted a permit to make the changes in October 2009. In late August 2010, the upgrades were completed, greatly improving the station's signal.

=== ATSC 3.0 conversion ===
KNMD-TV converted to ATSC 3.0 (Next Gen TV) on June 30, 2021. In preparation for this change, on February 15, World Channel began airing on KNME-TV channel 5.4, and Create debuted on 5.5. KNMD-TV simulcasts the entire KNME multiplex in ATSC 3.0 format. Prior to the conversion, KNMD received a construction permit to increase power from 5.14 kW to 16.6 kW.

== Technical information ==
=== Subchannels ===
The station's signal is multiplexed:

Subchannels of KNMD-TV
| Subchannel | Res. | Short name | Programming |
|---|---|---|---|
| 5.1 | 1080p | KNME HD | ATSC 3.0 simulcast of KNME-TV / PBS |
| 5.2 | 480p | Kids HD | ATSC 3.0 simulcast of KNME-DT2 / PBS Kids |
| 5.3 | 480p | FNX HD | ATSC 3.0 simulcast of KNME-DT3 / FNX |
| 5.4 | 1080p | KNMD HD | ATSC 3.0 simulcast of KNME-DT4 / World |
| 5.5 | 480p | Create | ATSC 3.0 simulcast of KNME-DT5 / Create |

In the new ATSC 3.0 signal, KNMD's main HD channel is on 5.4 and runs programming from the "World" public television network which airs mostly news and documentaries. Some hours are programmed locally with re-airings of recent PBS prime time shows. Locally produced programs such as New Mexico In Focus are also shown on KNMD.

KNMD had previously aired the PBS Satellite Service on channel 9.1 but on January 28, 2009, had moved PBS World from 9.2 to 9.1 and launched the how-to programming channel Create on 9.2.
