= Hotel Balderdash =

American children's television show

- Genre: Children's
- Created by: Larry John, Charlie LeSueur, Randy Lovoi
- Written by: Charlie LeSueur
- Directed by: Charlie LeSueur
- Starring: Larry John, Charlie LeSueur, Randy Lovoi
- Composer: Larry John
- Country of origin: United States
- Original language: English

Production
- Production locations: Salt Lake City, Utah, United States

Original release
- Network: KTVX

Hotel Balderdash is an American children's television show, produced by and broadcast from KCPX (later KTVX) in Salt Lake City from 1972 to 1982. The show featured three main characters who worked at the hotel: front desk manager Cannonball, bellboy Harvey, and the owner's shiftless nephew Raymond, who performed antics and slapstick skits in between cartoon clips.

It was seen mainly in Utah but could be viewed in parts of Arizona, Colorado, Idaho, Montana, Nevada, and Wyoming. The show debuted on KCPX-TV, the ABC affiliate in Salt Lake City, on September 11, 1972; soon after the debut of the show the station changed its call letters to KTVX. Hotel Balderdash lasted for over ten years as the most popular local show of any type in the area. Between 55% and 65% of the entire morning audience - all ages - would get up to watch this "local" children's program.

== Format ==
The show started out with a nearly two-hour format, starting at 6:45 in the morning and finishing at 8:40, in time for a 20-minute news broadcast. It eventually settled into an hour format - 7:00 am to 8:00 am, when ABC debuted its new morning program AM America, to go against NBC's Today Show. So popular was Hotel Balderdash, that a local newspaper wrote an article wondering what KTVX would do with their "proven winner", to air AM America. The station knew they had a winner with Balderdash, and decided to divide the two hours of AM America, airing the first hour at 6:00 am and the second hour at 8:00 am. AM America would eventually have a name change to Good Morning America.

== Hosts ==
The show starred Larry "Cannonball" John, Randy "Harvey" Lovoi and Charlie "Raymond" LeSueur. John and LeSueur had been given the idea for the show from popular kid's show host Bill "Wallace" Thompson of Wallace and Ladmo fame in Phoenix, Arizona. John had known Thompson from the time the young actor had been a co-host on the popular Phoenix talent show called Lew King Rangers. Thompson said that he had the idea for a show set in a hotel and have the guests as the characters. He suggested the name Balderdash for the show.

== Dynamics ==
The show had the popular dynamic of being set in a hotel with the manager, Cannonball, the bellhop, Harvey, and the owner's nephew, the spoiled brat Raymond. Monday through Friday, Raymond would continually try to get Harvey in trouble with Cannonball, only to be caught by Cannonball at the end of the show and punished for his mischief. The live audience of children and parents would go wild trying to warn Cannonball that Harvey was a victim of circumstance and that it was really Raymond causing the trouble.

== Supporting characters ==
The other characters on the show were mainly played by LeSueur, who also created most of the routines for the program. Everything the characters did on the show was ad-lib, with just the basic ideas that the threesome would go over in a meeting held before taping. Five shows would be taped in a three-hour period each Monday night for airplay Tuesday, Wednesday, Thursday, Friday, and the following Monday morning. These "bits" would be played between cartoons giving the "Balderdash Gang", as they became known, approximately 25 minutes of air time per show; therefore, with the quick taping it was truly 'live on tape.'

== Theme song ==
The show originally used the popular jazz tune Mississippi Mud as their theme song, but, when LeSueur left the show in 1976, John and Lovoi quickly adjusted and recorded two popular albums of original songs. The Hotel Balderdash theme song that is fondly remembered was on the first album - which is why there is no mention of Raymond in the song. The show's popularity continued to soar with Harvey and Cannonball, even having a "Hotel Balderdash Day" declared in Utah. So strong was the popularity of the two characters that the show continued to entertain, though by now, without LeSueur's "double entendre" characters, it focused more on being strictly a children's show. LeSueur returned to the show at various times and finally returned on more or less a permanent basis in 1979.

== Fame ==
At its height of popularity the characters of Harvey, Cannonball, and Raymond would draw huge crowds at any personal appearances. At Christmas time, when they made their regular appearances at the Sears department stores, Santa Claus would have to close up shop until they left because everyone wanted to see the Balderdash Gang. A story relating to their immense popularity is the year when the storyline had Raymond kidnapping Santa Claus on a Thursday morning installment. The Friday and Monday shows had already been taped and Santa was to be saved on the Monday show. KTVX was inundated Thursday with phone calls from angry parents whose kids were terribly upset at the kidnapping. The Threesome were called back Thursday night for an emergency taping session to make sure that Santa was saved by Cannonball and Harvey on Friday. Santa was saved and the kids - and parents - were happy.

== Cancellation and later years ==
By the time the show ended in the early 1980s, LeSueur was the only original member of the cast left on the program. By this time, the show was owned by a corporation. In a corporate move, Lovoi left the show and was replaced by Steve Farnworth as the lovable bellhop. For ten years Lovoi had nurtured the character of Harvey as a lovable, tall, lean, dark haired presence. Harvey now became a short, stocky, blond character. The chemistry had been destroyed. Eventually, John left and the show was cancelled without any fanfare. By this time, ABC had put pressure on KTVX to place the two halves of Good Morning America together or lose their ABC affiliation. They relegated Hotel Balderdash to a 30-minute time slot at 6:30 am with no cartoons. Very little of the show seems to be archived, as the station would reuse the same video tapes each week to tape the show.

After cancellation of the show, both Larry John and Charlie LeSueur moved to Mesa, Arizona. John cofounded Larry John Wright Advertising with longtime friend John Wright. LeSueur continued to work in television, film, radio and stage, and was also a film historian who wrote books on Westerns.

In 2010, Larry John and Randy Lovoi produced a new pilot episode for a revamped show on the now defunct Hotel Balderdash website. After originally agreeing to appear, Charlie LeSueur declined due to creative differences.

Steve Farnworth, the second Harvey, died in Mesa, Arizona on July 22, 2008 at age 58. Larry John died in Mesa, Arizona on February 19, 2018 at age 69. Charlie LeSueur died in Mesa, Arizona on November 19, 2019 at age 68.
