= Channel 79 =

Channel 79 was removed from television use in 1983, but was formerly used by several television stations in North America which broadcast on UHF frequencies covering 860-866 MHz:

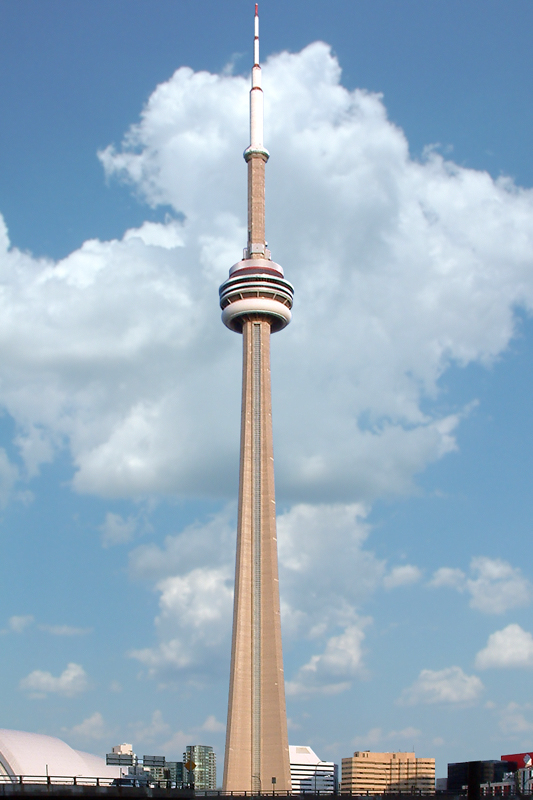
Toronto's CITY-TV broadcast on channel 79 from the CN Tower between 1976-1983

- CITY-TV in Toronto, Ontario first broadcast on this frequency in 1972, the highest frequency of any North American terrestrial originating station. Initially a 31 kW signal, it upgraded in 1976 to 208 kilowatts from the CN Tower. The station has been repeatedly displaced by cellular telephone encroachment on what were formerly broadcast frequencies. On July 1, 1983 the station was moved to channel 57; in August 2011 it moved to digital UHF channel 44 and in 2020 it was repacked to physical UHF 18, but it retains "57.1" as its over-the-air virtual channel.
- WTOH-TV in Toledo, Ohio was allocated to the now-defunct DuMont Television Network, but was never built; its construction permit was pulled by the FCC in 1960.
- WVIT 30 Hartford operated W79AI, a repeater in Torrington, Connecticut, from 1971-87; the transmitter building is now abandoned.
- KRQE (CBS Albuquerque) rebroadcaster K79AP Bayfield, Colorado was moved to K42DI channel 42 (now K34QD-D, channel 34).
- KGW (NBC Portland) rebroadcaster K79AI Hood River, Oregon has moved to K34FK channel 34.
- KHQ-TV (NBC Spokane) rebroadcaster K79AM Chelan, Washington was moved to K07JO channel 7.
- KIRO-TV (CBS Seattle) rebroadcaster K79BE Puyallup, Washington moved to K54GS channel 54.
- KOAA-TV (NBC Pueblo, Colorado) rebroadcaster K79BQ Deora, Colorado has moved to K45BU channel 45.
- KOPB-TV (PBS Portland) rebroadcaster K79BN Cottage Grove, Oregon was moved to K52CV channel 52 (now K20IR-D, channel 20).
- KOB-TV (NBC Albuquerque) rebroadcaster K79AD Romeo, Colorado has moved to K63AN channel 63.
- KOIN (CBS Portland) rebroadcaster K79AE Tillamook, Oregon moved to K52ET channel 52.
- KSNV (formerly KVBC, the NBC affiliate in Las Vegas) rebroadcaster K79CA Santa Clara, Utah became KVBT-LP channel 41.
- KSL-TV (NBC Salt Lake City) rebroadcaster K79AC/K79AL Evanston, Wyoming was moved to K32DS channel 32.
- KATU (ABC Portland) rebroadcaster K79AK Milton-Freewater, Oregon moved to K55GC channel 55.
- WBRE-TV (NBC Wilkes-Barre) rebroadcaster W79AC Clarks Summit, Pennsylvania moved to W51BP channel 51.

Channel 79 may also refer to:

- Argentina's Canal 79 Mar del Plata
- Dominican Republic's Tourist TV is also branded as "Channel 79"
