= Stratovision =

Use of aircraft to relay television transmissions

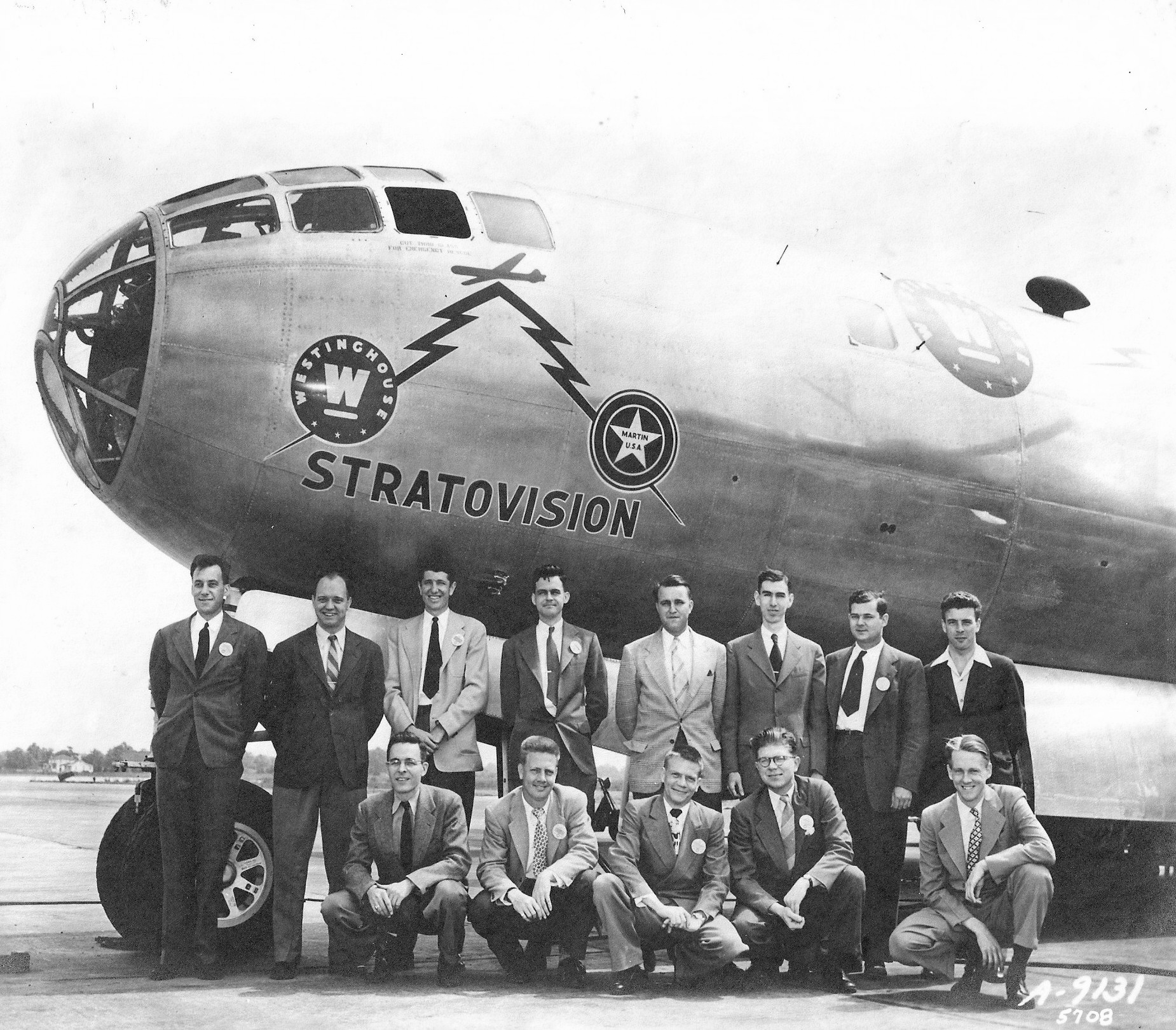
Westinghouse and Glenn L. Martin employees pose with B-29 Superfortress used in Stratovision tests. In rear row from left are Frank Gordon Mullins and C.E. Nobles, head of Stratovision for Westinghouse.

Stratovision was an airborne television transmission relay system using aircraft flying at high altitudes. In 1945, the Glenn L. Martin Company and Westinghouse Electric Corporation originally proposed television coverage of small towns and rural areas, as well as the large metropolitan centers, by 14 aircraft that would provide coverage for approximately 78% of the people in the United States. Although this was never implemented, the system has been used for domestic broadcasting in the United States, and by the U.S. military in South Vietnam and other countries.

== Technology ==
Because the broadcasting antenna for Stratovision is usually hung beneath the aircraft in flight, it naturally has a great command of line-of-sight propagation. Although transmission distances are dependent upon atmospheric conditions, a transmitting antenna 30,000 feet (9,100 m) above the Earth's surface has a line of sight distance of approximately 211 miles (340 km).

A Stratovision 25 kW transmitter operating from 30,000 feet (9,100 m) at 600 MHz will achieve a field intensity of 2 millivolts per meter for a 30-foot-high (9.1 m) receiving antenna up to 238 miles (383 km) away from the aircraft.

== Early tests ==
Stratovision tests were undertaken between June 1948 to February 1949. The first phase was undertaken by the Glenn L. Martin Co. and Westinghouse using a twin-engine PV-2 aircraft flying at 25,000 feet (7,600 m) that transmitted with 250 watts on 107.5 MHz and 5 kW on 514 MHz at Baltimore, Maryland, so that recordings could be made at various locations ranging from Norfolk, Virginia, to Pittsburgh, Pennsylvania, and Boston, Massachusetts.

The second phase of testing was undertaken by these companies using a stripped-down B-29 Superfortress flying at 30,000 feet (9,100 m). The plane was equipped to receive a relay transmission from WMAR-TV in Baltimore, which was then relayed over a 5 kW video transmitter and a 1 kW audio transmitter for reception on 82–88 MHz with a television set tuned to Channel 6.

The aircraft received its originating signals from circular dipoles attached to a streamlined 8-foot (2.4 m) mast atop of the aircraft's vertical tail fin. The retractable 28-foot-long (8.5 m) broadcasting antenna hung vertically beneath the aircraft. It was composed of a two-element turnstile array for video and a single-element circular dipole for sound transmissions.

The receivers, transmitters and necessary air-conditioning were all powered by the plane's engines using three 15 kVA, 500 Hz alternators. Without air conditioning the transmitters in the interior of the aircraft would have generated a temperature of 134 °F (57 °C) with an outside air temperature of 25 °F (−4 °C).

On 23 June 1948, the system's airborne transmitter rebroadcast the Republican National Convention, being held in Philadelphia, Pennsylvania, to the surrounding nine-state area during the 9 to 10 pm EDT time period. As part of the activity, a receiver was set up in a hall in Zanesville, Ohio, a small city on the outskirts of the broadcast area, to demonstrate to invited newspaper reporters that the system was capable of reaching "small town and farm homes".

The tests were watched by many television viewers who sent in reception reports. From these reports it was calculated that Stratovision would require only eight relay planes to provide a transcontinental network, and six additional planes to provide coverage to 78% of the United States. Charles Edward Nobles, the head of Stratovision for Westinghouse, said in his report:

"The major technical problems of the system have been solved, and the commercial development awaits only the crystallization of public demand for the expanded services offered by airborne broadcasting, application of the system by the radio industry to meet this demand, and the clarification of channel facilities available to make possible this application."

== Use for education ==
In 1961, a nonprofit organization, Midwest Program on Airborne Television Instruction, commenced a Stratovision service from the airfield of Purdue University. The effort began as a three-year experiment funded by the Ford Foundation. The program organized, produced and transmitted educational television programs four days a week from a DC-6AB aircraft flying at 23,000 feet (7,000 m) over the community of Montpelier in north central Indiana.

MPATI delivered its programs to television channels 72 (call sign KS2XGA) and 76 (KS2XGD) in the UHF band, by transmitting videotaped lectures from the aircraft to an estimated potential five million students in 13,000 schools and colleges. The aircraft were equipped with two 2-inch (51 mm) videotape machines and two UHF transmitters.

When MPATI signed on it used an "Indian head" test pattern card which was shown for five minutes before and between programs. The service ended in 1968 when it became embroiled in legal action over their application of Stratovision in a controversy with the Westinghouse company.

== Use for propaganda ==
During the Vietnam War, the United States Navy used Stratovision television technology when it flew Operation Blue Eagle from 1966 to 1972 over the Saigon area of South Vietnam. The television programs were aimed at two audiences on two channels: one was aimed at the general public and the other was intended for the information and entertainment of US troops who were stationed in South Vietnam.

On January 3, 1966, a Broadcasting magazine article, "Vietnam to get airborne TV: Two-channel service —one for Vietnamese, other for U.S. servicemen—starts this month", noted:

Television broadcasting in South Vietnam ... begins January 21 and it's going to be done from the air. Two airplanes, circling 10,000 to 20,000 feet [3,000 to 6,100 metres] above the ground, will broadcast on two TV channels—one transmitting Saigon government programs; the other U.S. programs. The project is being handled by the U.S. Navy. Also involved are the U.S. Information Agency and the Agency for International Development. Work on modifying two Lockheed Super Constellations has been underway by Navy electronics experts at Andrews Air Force Base ... The project is an outgrowth of a broadcasting plane used by the Navy during the Cuban and Dominican Republic crises when both radio and television were beamed to home in those countries.

The same article went on to report that during the 1965 World Series, Stratovision had also been used to bring the games to the troops. The aircraft had picked up Voice of America radio broadcasts from California and relayed the signal to a ground broadcasting station. The Agency for International Development (AID) had purchased, through the military Post Exchange Service, 1,000 monochrome 23-inch (58 cm) television sets modified to operate on a variety of domestic power sources, and which had been airlifted to South Vietnam on December 28, 1965. They were to be put into community facilities around Saigon. AID was also spending $2.4 million to supply a total of 2,500 TV sets to South Vietnam.

The entire project was under the control of Captain George C. Dixon, USN. He claimed to be installing AM, FM, shortwave and TV transmitters on the aircraft which would get their power from an onboard 100 kW diesel-fueled generator. The planes would not only relay programs from film chain kinescopes and video recorders, but they would also have live cameras to create their own live programs.

Ground transmissions would be received from the aircraft on TV sets tuned to channel 11 for Armed Forces Television, and channel 9 for programs in Vietnamese. On radio, the broadcasts would be tuned to 1000 kHz for AM and 99.9 MHz for FM.

On 7 February 1966, Broadcasting magazine reported that after working out a number of technical problems that the first show on channel 9 would begin at 7:30 p.m. and feature South Vietnamese Prime Minister Nguyen Cao Ky and U.S. Ambassador Henry Cabot Lodge in a videotaped production, followed by channel 11 at 8 p.m. with General Westmoreland introducing a two-hour program which incorporated one hour of the Grand Ole Opry filmed in Nashville, Tennessee. After that, the Vietnamese channel would be seen for 90 minutes a day and the U.S. channel for three hours daily.

On 8 February 1966, The New York Times article "South Vietnamese Watch First TV Show" reported that South Vietnamese viewers had to strain their ears because the speakers on the TV sets would need to be amplified if they were going to be heard by a room full of people watching THVN-TV channel 9. The U.S. programming on NWB-TV channel 11 was Bob Hope in a two-hour special called Hollywood Salute to Vietnam, followed by 30 minutes of the Grand Ole Opry and another 30 minutes of the quiz show I've Got a Secret. The regular line-up of shows included Bonanza, Perry Mason, The Ed Sullivan Show, and The Tonight Show Starring Johnny Carson.

== Other uses ==
In 1969, news stories began to appear in the United Kingdom that Ronan O'Rahilly, the founder of the pirate radio ship based service called Radio Caroline, which at that time was not on the air, was about to launch Caroline Television instead. His plans called for two aircraft, one in service and one as a relief, which would transmit commercial television programs to Britain by Stratovision. Although these stories continued for some time, nothing became of the project. No pirate radio or television service has ever operated by means of Stratovision.

The advent of fibre optic cable television systems and direct broadcast satellite services has supplanted Stratovision as a permanent means of television delivery. The Stratovision concept continues to be used as a stop-gap measure where land-based transmitters are not possible and where large areas of territory need to be served with a television program.

== Similar use cases with other aircraft ==
On September 30, 1954, Cuba used a DC-3 to broadcast Game 2 of the 1954 World Series from the United States, the first live extra-continental broadcast.

EC-130 Commando Solo was used in propaganda warfare during the 1999 NATO bombing of the Federal Republic of Yugoslavia with questionable success. Production was very cheap, below local TV standards in Federal Republic of Yugoslavia with slide show and narration based news. Quality of reception was very poor and area of coverage was rather small. During the 2000s, the EC-130 Commando Solo has been used to broadcast information and propaganda for the United States over a variety of television and radio frequencies. It has been used in several areas of operation, including Bosnia and Iraq.

=== In popular culture ===
- The plot of the 1986 comedy film Riders of the Storm (also known as The American Way) is based on a similar concept, with a group of Vietnam veterans running a pirate television station ("S&M TV") from a B-29 that was constantly in flight.
- A similar system, using helicopters, is mentioned in the 1950 Robert A. Heinlein story "The Man Who Sold the Moon".
