= Midwest Program on Airborne Television Instruction =

American educational broadcasting organization

The Midwest Program on Airborne Television Instruction (MPATI) was a special broadcasting initiative designed to broadcast educational television programming to schools, especially in areas where local educational television stations are either difficult to receive or unavailable. From 1961 through 1968, MPATI's programming broadcast from two DC-6AB aircraft based at the Purdue University Airport in West Lafayette, Indiana, using a broadcasting technique known as Stratovision.

== History ==
The undertaking began as a three-year experiment in 1960, with MPATI organizing, producing, and broadcasting instructional television with seed money from the Ford Foundation. This was a nonprofit organization of educators and television producers that pioneered instructional television for enriching education in public schools throughout the midwest. This was prior to the advent of satellite television transmission. By 1963, MPATI moved into its second phase where it relied entirely on membership fees, but was never financially stable. MPATI found it difficult to get enough member schools to finance the organization. In its third reorganization, MPATI, unable to meet expenses through membership fees, ceased producing and broadcasting courses in 1968 and became a tape library.

One of the two aircraft would go aloft for six to eight hours at a time. They orbited a 20-minute figure-eight station centered over Montpelier, Indiana (35 miles north of Muncie, Indiana) at an altitude of 23,000 feet. From this position the range of transmission was approximately 200 miles in diameter. Station transmissions included both Chicago and Detroit metropolitan areas. When on station the plane would reduce speed, and then lower a 40-foot antenna mast which was gyroscopically stabilized so that the antenna always aligned from the aircraft to the center of the Earth. This stabilization feature helped to maintain polarization of the signals from the planes. Beam characteristics of the antenna were sharp and reception was optimized by placing the reception antenna as near as practical to the ground and pointing it toward the Montpelier location to minimize multipath canceling and interference.

Programming from the planes was pre-recorded. Program slates, taped classroom instruction and test patterns with canned music were all that was aired from the MPATI planes. Frequently snowy pictures were what students saw from the low-power transmitters of KS2XGA or KS2XGD channels 72 and 76 UHF respectively.

The television equipment and transmitters were powered by a gas-turbine electrical power plant in the aft of the DC-6; equipment similar to auxiliary power units in later jet transport aircraft for engine starting.
