= KNME-TV =

Television station in Albuquerque, New Mexico

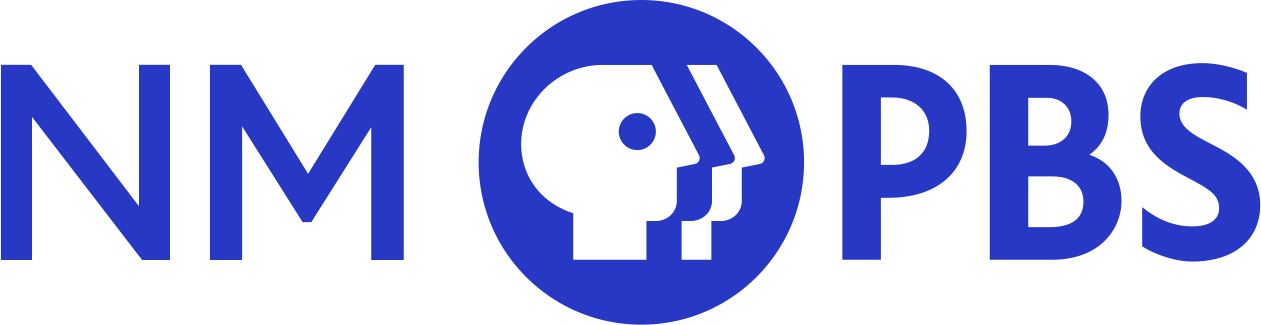
- Albuquerque–Santa Fe, New Mexico; United States
- City: Albuquerque, New Mexico
- Channels: Digital: 35 (UHF); Virtual: 5
- Branding: NM PBS

Programming
- Affiliations: 5.1: PBS; for others, see § Subchannels

Ownership
- Owner: University of New Mexico; Albuquerque Public Schools; (The Regents of the University of New Mexico & the Board of Education of the City of Albuquerque, New Mexico)
- Sister stations: KNMD-TV

History
- First air date: May 1, 1958
- Former channel numbers: Analog: 5 (VHF, 1958–2009)
- Former affiliations: NET (1958–1970)
- Call sign meaning: New Mexico Educational (Television)

Technical information
- Licensing authority: FCC
- Facility ID: 55528
- ERP: 250 kW
- HAAT: 1,287 m (4,222 ft)
- Transmitter coordinates: 35°12′49.8″N 106°27′3.3″W
- Translator(s): see § Translators

Links
- Public license information: Public file; LMS
- Website: www.newmexicopbs.org

KNME-TV (channel 5), branded as New Mexico PBS or NMPBS, is a PBS member television station in Albuquerque, New Mexico, United States. It is jointly owned by the University of New Mexico (UNM) and Albuquerque Public Schools (APS) alongside Santa Fe–licensed KNMD-TV (channel 5). The two stations share studios on UNM's North Campus on University Boulevard Northeast in Albuquerque; KNME-TV's transmitter is located atop Sandia Crest.

KNME-TV began broadcasting on May 1, 1958, and was the only educational television station in New Mexico until the 1970s. It operated from a converted sorority house on the UNM campus and provided national public programming as well as courses for schools and colleges. In its early years, the station was known for its TV Kindergarten as well as a science series hosted by George Fischbeck. The present studio building on University Boulevard opened in 1970, tripling available space. KNME provided footage to local and national broadcasters of the New Mexico State Penitentiary riot in 1980 and co-produced the 1992 documentary Surviving Columbus, which won a Peabody Award. It was the first station in the state to broadcast a digital signal.

KNME is governed by a seven-member board featuring three designees each from UNM and APS. It produces the local series ¡Colores! and New Mexico in Focus and provides distribution services to public television for programming from Deutsche Welle and Democracy Now!.

== History ==
=== Construction and early years ===
Channel 5 was set aside for educational use in Albuquerque, New Mexico, by the Federal Communications Commission (FCC) in 1952. In March 1957, the University of New Mexico (UNM) Board of Regents and Albuquerque Public Schools (APS) reached a deal to jointly file for the channel, which would be run by a governing board featuring representatives of both entities. The application was filed with the FCC on July 19 and granted on October 23. Plans were drawn up to use the new station to beam junior college classes to outlying areas, while a studio was set up in a converted sorority house on the UNM campus. Albuquerque's KOB-TV (channel 4) sold its original transmitter facility on Sandia Crest to UNM; KOB was in the process of upgrading to a new transmitter. Even while the station was not on the air, UNM sent out kinescopes of courses for playback elsewhere.

Edith Buchanan's English class was the first program broadcast over KNME-TV on May 1, 1958. On May 19, the first National Educational Television (NET) network programming was presented. Operation of KNME-TV was originally headed by Bernarr Cooper of the UNM speech department. Cooper departed in 1959 and was replaced by Claude Hempen, a UNM alumnus with experience in commercial broadcasting. By 1960, KNME was offering 350 hours a year of telecourses, and 60% of its output was live. That same year, a Ford Foundation grant enabled the station to purchase its first video tape equipment. The recorder enabled KNME to present programs at different times to suit school needs. Programs for schools were received in points as distant as Carlsbad and Durango, Colorado.

One of KNME's local programs in the 1960s was TV Kindergarten, hosted by Joyce Marron. The program for preschoolers won awards from Ohio State University and NET. It was discontinued in 1970 with the advent of the nationally distributed Sesame Street. The station also had a children's science program hosted by George Fischbeck, as well as a program of local musical performances; a UNM sports review; and an outdoors program. Fischbeck went on to become a commercial weather broadcaster at KOB-TV before moving to Los Angeles and KABC-TV in 1972. The station upgraded its transmitter power in 1966 and began producing local programs in color the next year. Sunday broadcasting began in 1968. In 1970, it moved into a purpose-built building at 1130 University NE on the UNM campus. Built in adobe architectural style, it had triple the square footage and a studio three times the size. KNME began seven-day-a-week operation in 1971. In 1973, it was one of very few public stations not to initially carry coverage of the Watergate hearings, with Hempen citing a lack of financial support.

UNM moved to suspend station director Hempen in August 1974, amid an investigation that centered on his role at a firm that sold audio instructional aids to UNM and APS. The university fired Hempen, citing irregularities in paying employees and overcharging UNM for travel expenses; he claimed campus politics and personalities on a separate ad hoc committee, then studying the station's operation, were to blame for his dismissal. Though the UNM Board of Regents ordered Hempen reinstated, KNME's board of directors refused to issue him a new contract.

In the wake of the Hempen dismissal, station operations were overhauled with a view to increasing community participation. A series of proposed changes included the establishment of a community advisory board and a friends group to support station operations. The relationship between KNME and its two owners, criticized in the ad hoc committee's report as so nebulous that KNME operated essentially autonomously, was renewed and strengthened with a more active board. The next year, KNME obtained the rights to telecast New Mexico Lobos men's basketball games, after all the bids from commercial broadcasters were turned down as too low. With UNM basketball, KNME had the highest penetration within its market of any PBS station in the country, per Nielsen ratings.

=== The Cooper years (1979–2001) ===
Hempen was replaced as KNME-TV manager by Robert Gordon, the director of engineering. He asked to return to an engineering position in 1979 and was replaced by Jon H. Cooper, who had previously been with other public broadcasting organizations in the western U.S. In Cooper's first year, the station assumed a role in defusing the 1980 New Mexico State Penitentiary riot. KNME had recently produced a documentary on the penitentiary, Doing Time. Cameraman Rick Johnson and Ernie Mills, host of Report from Santa Fe, were the first media representatives allowed, and KNME's footage was provided to all local stations and the national networks.

KNME began televising the New Mexico Symphony Orchestra, and in January 1981 it debuted a nightly news program. The Illustrated Daily was trimmed in 1984, in response to APS budget cuts that reduced the school system's support of channel 5. The school board had cut the funds in response to a state legislative mandate to spend at least 49 percent of its operating budget on salaries. It became On Assignment; host Hal Rhoades departed in 1988.

The KNME documentary Surviving Columbus: The Story of the Pueblo People, a co-production with the Institute of American Indian Arts, was aired nationally by PBS in October 1992 and won the station a Peabody Award, the first for any New Mexico broadcaster since 1954.

KNME went through multiple rounds of budget cuts in the 1990s. In 1991, it laid off four employees and reduced the number of episodes it made of the cultural series ¡Colores! and newsmagazine At Week's End. APS made a second budget cut in 1993, directing $167,000 originally allocated for KNME to employee salaries; and the Corporation for Public Broadcasting (CPB) docked the station $70,000 in 1996 after finding the station had overstated its non-federal financial support and thus the grant money it could receive. The next year, more governmental cuts and slow fundraising led KNME to cut some positions and defer filling others. During this time, UNM proposed abolishing the UNM–APS board that oversaw KNME and placing station operations under the two organizations' administrators, an idea APS rejected.

=== Digital conversion ===
Cooper retired in 2001 and became a volunteer focused on raising funds to convert KNME-TV to digital broadcasting. His replacement was Ted Garcia, previously of KETC in St. Louis and other stations. Under Garcia, KNME was the first New Mexico television station to broadcast in digital, commencing service from KNME-DT in November 2001. A second and digital-only station, KNMD-TV (channel 9)—licensed to UNM exclusively—began in 2004.

In 2007, one of the members of the KNME-TV board, Robert McNeill, went public with claims that UNM had improperly allocated funds it obtained in a 2004 voter-approved bond. The $2.3 million was intended to support the second phase of KNME's digital conversion. Though the bond made no mention of New Mexico's other public TV stations, then-acting UNM president David Harris opted to divide the money evenly with KRWG-TV in Las Cruces and KENW in Portales. That same year, station employees gave Garcia a vote of no confidence, citing low morale and poor staff relations. After Garcia was hired by the Corporation for Public Broadcasting, he was succeeded at KNME by Polly Anderson, previously of KWBU radio and television in Waco, Texas.

=== New Mexico PBS era ===
In 2012, KNME-TV began branding as New Mexico PBS. That year, it aired the documentary Bataan: A 70th Anniversary Commemoration in 2012, covering the Bataan Death March; two New Mexico Army units were among those involved in the event. The Library of Congress requested some of the program's interviews for inclusion. Franz Joachim became general manager and CEO of New Mexico PBS in 2013.

The Rescissions Act of 2025 defunded the Corporation for Public Broadcasting, which had contributed between 15 and 20 percent of KNME-TV's budget. The cut amounted to $1.7 million for fiscal year 2026. In response, the New Mexico state government provided emergency funding for KNME and the state's other public media organizations, on top of its annual appropriations to the university licensees. Phil Hoffman, previously of WIPB in Muncie, Indiana, was hired in 2026 after Joachim's retirement.

== Governance ==
KNME-TV is operated by UNM and APS pursuant to a joint powers agreement last amended in 1978. It has a seven-member governing board which includes three appointees by the UNM president, three by the APS superintendent, and one community representative. The station is a department of UNM.

== Local programming ==
The arts and culture series ¡Colores! debuted in 1989, initially in 26-episode seasons and then as a series of special documentaries.

In 1998, the weekly news series At Week's End was replaced with In Focus (now New Mexico in Focus), a public affairs newsmagazine.

== Other initiatives ==
KNME provides distribution of live news programs from Deutsche Welle and Democracy Now!, as well as BBC syndicated material, to the PBS system. In 2026, it provided distribution of the A Capitol Fourth concert for PBS.

== Technical information ==
=== Subchannels ===
KNME-TV's primary transmitter is located on Sandia Crest. The station's signal is multiplexed:

Subchannels of KNME-TV
Subchannel	Res.	Short name	Programming
5.1	1080i	NMPBS	PBS
5.2	480i	PBSKids	PBS Kids
5.3	480i	FNX	FNX
5.4	1080i	World	World
5.5	480i	Create	Create

KNME-TV shut down its analog signal, over VHF channel 5, on June 12, 2009, the official digital television transition date. The station's digital signal remained on its pre-transition UHF channel 35, using virtual channel 5.

KNME began broadcasting FNX in 2016. PBS Kids replaced the Spanish-language V-me network in 2017. On February 15, 2021, World Channel began airing on channel 5.4 and Create debuted on 5.5. These channels, simulcasts of KNMD-TV 9.1 and 9.2, were added in preparation for KNMD-TV's planned June 30 conversion to ATSC 3.0 format; KNMD-TV simulcasts the entire KNME multiplex. Moving them to KNME-TV also made them available on all of its dependent translators.

=== Translators ===
KNME-TV is broadcast over translators in central, northern, and western New Mexico, including three owned by the Navajo Nation.

- Angel Fire: K33FK-D
- Aztec: K10CG-D, K22NT-D
- Capulin, etc.: K33GC-D
- Chama: K15JO-D
- Cimarron: K28GF-D
- Conchas Dam: K18HR-D
- Cuba: K34HF-D
- Farmington: K31PM-D, K36PP-D
- Gallina: K31HB-D
- Gallup: K23FE-D
- Grants, Milan: K33GA-D
- Las Vegas: K33FL-D
- Moon Ranch: K23OO-D
- Mora: K31EO-D
- Mountainair: KNME-TV (DRT) 31
- Roy: K34FQ-D
- Santa Rosa: K30FP-D
- Shiprock: K18LG-D, K22NP-D*
- Socorro: K33PG-D
- Taos: K18LC-D
- Thoreau: K31JR-D
- Tohatchi: K25QD-D*
- Tres Piedras: K28GV-D
- Wagon Mound: K36FQ-D
- White Oaks, etc.: K22FN-D
- Window Rock, Arizona: K33QC-D*
- Zuni Pueblo: K33QD-D
