= KOAA-TV =

Television station in Pueblo, Colorado

- Pueblo–Colorado Springs, Colorado; United States
- City: Pueblo, Colorado
- Channels: Digital: 25 (UHF); Virtual: 5
- Branding: KOAA 5; KOAA News 5

Programming
- Affiliations: 5.1: NBC; for others, see § Subchannels

Ownership
- Owner: E. W. Scripps Company; (Scripps Broadcasting Holdings LLC)
- Sister stations: KKTV; KZCS-LD

History
- First air date: July 13, 1953
- Former call signs: KCSJ-TV (1953–1962)
- Former channel numbers: Analog: 5 (VHF, 1953–2009); Digital: 42 (UHF, until 2020)
- Call sign meaning: Variant of what was formerly KOA-TV, now KCNC-TV in Denver

Technical information
- Licensing authority: FCC
- Facility ID: 59014
- ERP: 1,000 kW
- HAAT: 677 m (2,221 ft)
- Transmitter coordinates: 38°44′38.9″N 104°51′47.7″W
- Translator(s): see § Translators

Links
- Public license information: Public file; LMS
- Website: www.koaa.com

KOAA-TV (channel 5) is a television station licensed to Pueblo, Colorado, United States, serving as the NBC affiliate for the Colorado Springs area. It is owned by the E. W. Scripps Company alongside CBS affiliate KKTV (channel 11) and low-power station KZCS-LD (channel 18). KOAA-TV's main studios and business offices are located on 7th Avenue in Pueblo, with a satellite studio and news bureau in the Tech Center office complex in Colorado Springs; its transmitter is located on Cheyenne Mountain.

KOAA-TV operates a low-power digital translator, K30JM-D (channel 30) in Colorado Springs, whose transmitter is also located on Cheyenne Mountain.

== History ==
The station signed on for the first time on July 13, 1953, as KCSJ-TV, owned by the Star-Chieftain Publishing Corporation, owners of Pueblo's two major newspapers, the morning Pueblo Chieftain and evening Pueblo Star-Journal, along with KCSJ radio. It is Colorado's second-oldest station outside of Denver.

During the 1950s, KCSJ-TV was one of two full-time NBC affiliates serving Southern Colorado—the other being KRDO-TV (channel 13) in Colorado Springs, about 40 miles (64 km) to the north. In 1960, the Federal Communications Commission (FCC) collapsed all of southern Colorado into a single television market. At this point, KCSJ-TV moved its transmitter closer to Colorado Springs and became the area's sole NBC affiliate, with KRDO-TV switching to ABC.

In 1962, Star-Chieftain sold KCSJ-TV to Metropolitan Broadcasting, owners of KOA-AM-FM-TV in Denver. KCSJ-TV then became KOAA-TV in March of that year, but remained a free-standing station programmed separately from Denver's KOA-TV (now KCNC-TV). The two stations did, however, occasionally do cross-promotion, and both were NBC affiliates (its former sister station in Denver is now a CBS O&O). With much wealthier ownership, KOAA was able to add videotape in 1962. In 1967, it became the first television station in Southern Colorado to broadcast local programming in color. When the Denver stations were sold off to General Electric in 1968, Metropolitan sold KOAA to local owner Sangre De Cristo Broadcasting Corporation (with shares owned by William Grant, Helen T. White, and Mahlon T. White) in a separate deal.

KOAA floundered through the early and mid-1970s, largely because of reception problems in the northern part of the market. When channel 5 moved its transmitter closer to Colorado Springs, it had to conform its signal to protect KFBC-TV (now KGWN-TV) in Cheyenne, Wyoming. As a result, while most of Colorado Springs received the channel 5 signal very well, it was barely viewable in northern Colorado Springs and that city's northern suburbs because of the area's rugged terrain. Most viewers in the northern portion of the market could not get a clear signal from KOAA until cable arrived in the market in the 1970s. This posed a problem for KOAA, as the Colorado Springs area began an unprecedented period of growth that continues to this day while Pueblo remained relatively unchanged. It did not help matters that NBC spent most of the 1970s at the bottom of the ratings.

KOAA finally rebounded in 1977 when the Evening Post Publishing Company of Charleston, South Carolina, bought the station and brought in former ABC executive John Gilbert as general manager (the licensee would be renamed Sangre De Cristo Communications Incorporated). Evening Post's broadcasting arm eventually evolved into Cordillera Communications and continued to be a subsidiary of Evening Post Publishing Company. Soon after Gilbert's arrival, KOAA opened a studio and sales office in Colorado Springs and steadily beefed up its news operation. In 1980, KOAA signed on K30AA, a 132,500-watt translator on channel 30 in Colorado Springs, bringing a clear signal to the northern part of that city for the first time ever. For the next three decades, it branded itself as "5/30" (denoting both the main and Colorado Springs translator channels). It was also during this time that KOAA adopted the Eyewitness News format that was popular with TV stations nationwide during the 1970s and 1980s. The station's resurgence came around the same time that NBC rebounded to become the highest-rated network in the country.

Cordillera announced on October 29, 2018, that it would sell most of its stations, including KOAA, to the E. W. Scripps Company. The sale was completed on May 1, 2019. For the second time in its history, channel 5 became a sister station to a Denver station, this time with KMGH-TV, and as such KOAA shares news sources and certain reporters with KMGH.

== News operation ==
KOAA currently broadcasts 37 hours of locally produced newscasts each week (with six hours each weekday and 3 1/2 hours each on Saturdays and Sundays). Among the Colorado Springs–Pueblo TV stations that signed on originally in the 1950s, KOAA was the last station to start a morning newscast, which began in January 1996 as an hour-long program leading into NBC's Today show, and nudging KRDO-TV to expand the length of its newscast to a half hour at the time (it ran for 15 minutes since its 1983 sign on) and did it one week before the debut of KOAA's morning news program. KOAA was the second TV station in the market to add morning newscasts on the weekends starting in 2010.

Starting in 2001, KOAA used the NewsFirst 5/30 name for its morning and midday newscasts but continued to use the Eyewitness News brand for all other dayparts until February 8, 2002 (the first day of the 2002 Winter Olympics). On that date, the station adopted the News First brand for all of its newscasts.

In 2009, the branding was changed to NewsFirst 5, since its translator system (including K30AA, now K30JM-D) could remap to virtual channel 5 throughout the market. The name was modified slightly to News 5 in 2011. The station operates a News 5 Now channel on its second subchannel which is carried by the cable systems in both Colorado Springs and Pueblo, and includes news updates along with real-time weather forecasts and conditions. KOAA used to have newscasts at 4 and 9 p.m. on News 5 Now, but it would later cancel the 4 p.m. newscast and reduced the 9 p.m. newscast to 10 minutes. Eventually the 9 p.m. newscast was canceled altogether. In the fall of 2020, KOAA would bring back a 4 p.m. newscast but this time on the main KOAA channel and running as hour long lead in to its 5 p.m. half hour newscast, coupled with direct competition from KKTV and KRDO-TV which also run full hour long newscasts in the 4 p.m. hour. However by late December 2021, KOAA cut the 4 p.m. news hour to a half hour starting at 4:30 p.m., in order to clear a national news program called Newsfeed produced by KOAA's parent company Scripps that airs a half hour earlier. In April 2021, KOAA restored a full hour of local news at 4 p.m.

On February 18, 2010, KOAA-TV became the third station in the Colorado Springs–Pueblo market to broadcast its newscasts in true high definition and 16:9 widescreen, beginning with its midday newscast.

== Technical information ==
=== Subchannels ===
The station's signal is multiplexed:

Subchannels of KOAA-TV
Subchannel	Res.	Short name	Programming
5.1	1080i	NBC-HD	NBC
5.2	1080i	CourtTV	Court TV
5.3	480i	Grit	Grit
5.4	480i	ION	Ion
5.5	480i	BUSTED	Busted
5.6	480i	ShopLC	Shop LC
5.7	480i	HSN2	HSN2
5.8	480i	Laff	Laff

KOAA-TV activated its digital television signal on channel 42 (virtual channel 5.1) on August 1, 2006. It has the capability to broadcast in Dolby 5.1 surround sound. It began broadcasting "NewsFirst NOW" (originally named "WeatherFirst NOW" at launch in 2004) as a digital subchannel (5.2) after only having it on local cable systems earlier. On September 15, 2015, the subchannel became an affiliate of WeatherNation TV, while retaining the "News 5 NOW" name.

=== Analog-to-digital conversion ===
KOAA-TV shut down its analog signal, over VHF channel 5, on June 12, 2009, the official date on which full-power television stations in the United States transitioned from analog to digital broadcasts under federal mandate. The station's digital signal remained on its pre-transition UHF channel 42, using virtual channel 5.

On April 15, 2010, K30AA was converted from analog to digital and continues to operate as a repeater of KOAA-TV. On June 14, K30AA changed its calls to K30JM-D.

=== Translators ===
- K19DY-D Cañon City
- K34LN-D Cheyenne Wells
- K30JM-D Colorado Springs
- K16LF-D Eads, etc.
- K19HC-D Hoehne
- K33KV-D Lamar
- K23KN-D Las Animas
- KOAA-TV (DRT) 16 Pueblo
