= KKTV =

Television station in Colorado Springs, Colorado

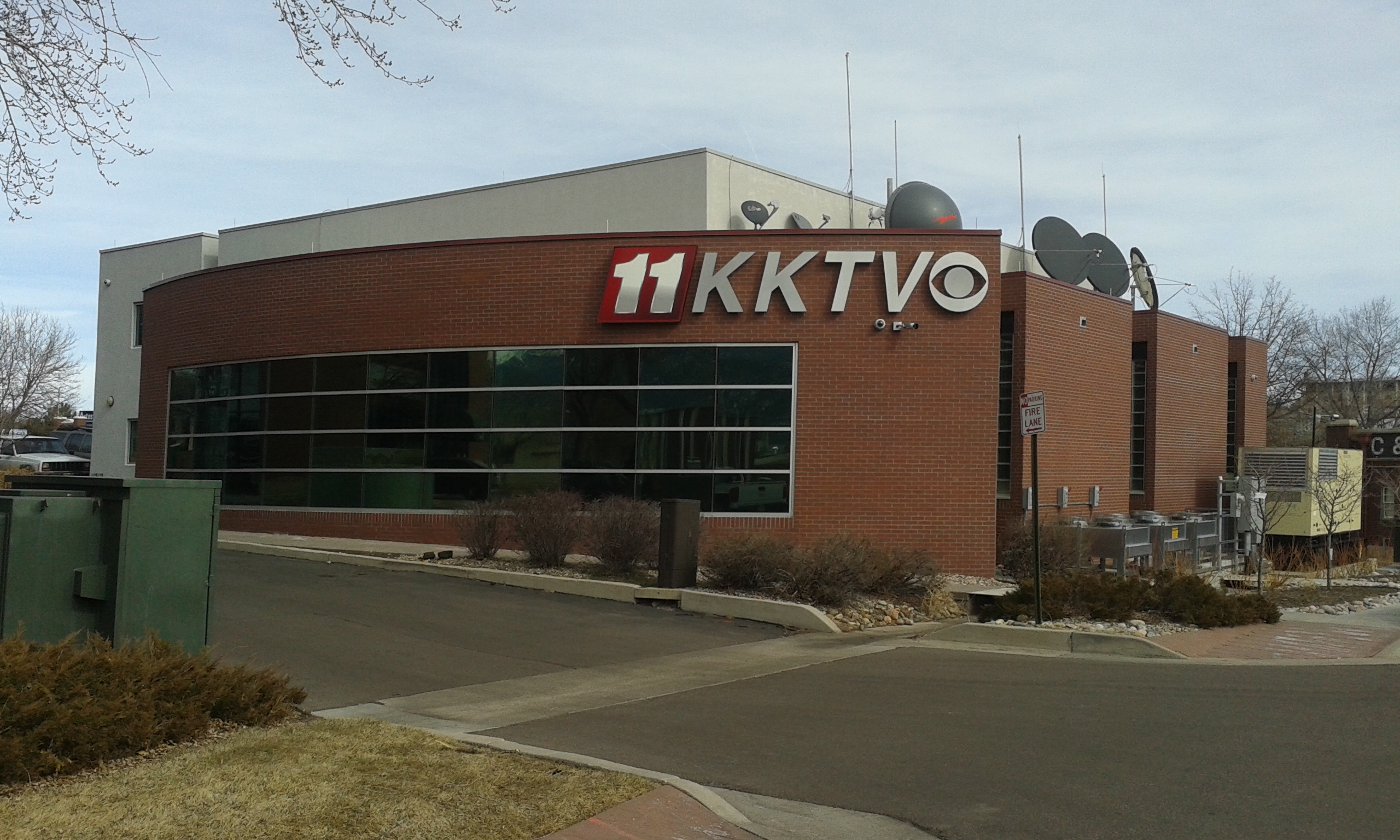
- Colorado Springs studio
- Colorado Springs–Pueblo, Colorado; United States
- City: Colorado Springs, Colorado
- Channels: Digital: 26 (UHF); Virtual: 11
- Branding: KKTV 11; KKTV 11 Alert; MyKKTV (11.2)

Programming
- Affiliations: 11.1: CBS; 11.2: MeTV & MyNetworkTV; 11.3: Outlaw

Ownership
- Owner: E. W. Scripps Company; (ION Television License, LLC)
- Sister stations: KOAA-TV; KZCS-LD

History
- First air date: December 7, 1952
- Former channel numbers: Analog: 11 (VHF, 1952–2009); Digital: 10 (VHF, 2003–2011), 49 (UHF, 2011–2019)
- Former affiliations: All secondary: NBC (1952–1953); DuMont (1952–1956); ABC (1952–1960)

Technical information
- Licensing authority: FCC
- Facility ID: 35037
- ERP: 350 kW
- HAAT: 719.7 m (2,361 ft)
- Transmitter coordinates: 38°44′42″N 104°51′45″W

Links
- Public license information: Public file; LMS
- Website: www.kktv.com

KKTV (channel 11) is a television station in Colorado Springs, Colorado, United States, affiliated with CBS. It is owned by the E. W. Scripps Company alongside NBC affiliate KOAA-TV (channel 5). KKTV's studios are located on East Colorado Avenue in downtown Colorado Springs, and its transmitter is located on Cheyenne Mountain.

== History ==
KKTV signed on the air on December 7, 1952. It is the third-oldest station in Colorado—behind Denver's KWGN-TV and KUSA-TV—and the oldest outside Denver. The station's first studio located on Mill Street was too small from the beginning. It originally carried programming from CBS, NBC, ABC, and DuMont. In 1953, KRDO-TV (channel 13) signed on and took the NBC affiliation. DuMont folded in 1956, leaving KKTV as a primary CBS affiliate and secondary ABC affiliate. That same year, the station moved its operations to a new building located on South Tejon Street in Colorado Springs.

By 1960, the formerly separate Colorado Springs and Pueblo markets became one single market serving the Pikes Peak region and surrounding areas with each of the area's three TV stations becoming "exclusive" network affiliates. KKTV became a sole CBS affiliate with KRDO-TV becoming a full-time ABC affiliate and Pueblo's KCSJ-TV (channel 5, now KOAA-TV), which had been a primary NBC affiliate since its inception in 1953, becoming the area's sole NBC affiliate. In 1963, KKTV's original owners, TV Colorado, sold the station to Willard W. Garvey, who held a minority stake in Stauffer Publications Stations. In December 1968, KKTV relocated to a new studio facility on North Nevada Avenue in Colorado Springs, which had previously functioned as a film stage. By the time the move was complete, a deal had been reached to sell KKTV to the Capitol Broadcasting Company of Jackson, Mississippi, (Note: Not related to the Capitol Broadcasting Company of Raleigh, North Carolina.) which owned radio and television properties in that city.

In late 1982, Capitol Broadcasting Company sold KKTV to the Seattle-based Ackerley Group (originally called Ackerley Communications), becoming one of that company's earliest acquisitions. Ackerley owned the station until early 1999 when it swapped KKTV to Benedek Broadcasting in exchange for KCOY in Santa Maria, California. Gray Media acquired KKTV when it bought most of Benedek's stations in April 2002 as part of Benedek's bankruptcy liquidation.

On October 17, 2009; KKTV became the second station in the Colorado Springs–Pueblo market to present its newscasts in high definition (HD) beginning with its 10 p.m. newscast.

On June 23, 2012, at around 2 p.m. MDT, KKTV began to provide live 24/7 continuous coverage of the Waldo Canyon fire in Colorado Springs. KKTV called in help from KOLN in Lincoln, Nebraska, WOWT in Omaha, Nebraska, KCNC-TV in Denver, and KOLO-TV in Reno, Nevada (KOLN, WOWT, and KOLO are sister stations to KKTV, CBS-owned KCNC shares a helicopter with KKTV), to help out with the coverage of the fire. The nonstop coverage wrapped up at midnight on June 29, 130 hours after it started. KKTV's syndicated and CBS programming were shown on Channel 11.2 during its 24/7 fire coverage. The coverage was praised by various critics, and won the Colorado Springs Independent's Best Local TV Newscast award for 2012, ending a long streak in that category by KOAA. KKTV's news ratings have gone up considerably since their Waldo Canyon fire coverage, and as of January 2013, they are claiming their news ratings are "Southern Colorado's Most Watched", higher than KOAA or KRDO.

Logo of KKTV from 2022 to 2025

KKTV announced plans to move into a new location at 520 East Colorado Avenue in downtown Colorado Springs. The move was completed in mid-2013.

On July 7, 2025, it was announced that, in an exchange of several stations between Gray Media and the E. W. Scripps Company, KKTV would be traded to Scripps, forming a duopoly with KOAA. At the time, the swap required regulatory action at the FCC because existing rules would not have permitted the common ownership of KKTV and KOAA without a waiver. The next month, the federal appeals court decision Zimmer Radio of Mid-Missouri v. FCC struck down limitations on one company owning two of the top four stations in a market. This removed the legal impediment for Scripps to acquire KKTV. The FCC approved the multi-market exchange on April 28, 2026.

== News operation ==
KKTV currently broadcasts 35 hours of locally produced newscasts (with six hours each weekday, two hours on Saturdays, and three hours on Sundays). KKTV was the last station in the Colorado Springs–Pueblo market to produce morning newscasts on the weekends, which began on the weekend of November 13–14, 2021. However, KKTV was the second TV station in the Colorado Springs–Pueblo market to broadcast an early morning newscast beginning in late 1992 originally running a full hour, while rival KRDO-TV continued to stick with a 15-minute length morning newscast (and would eventually extend the program's length beginning in early 1996).

== Technical information ==
Logo for KKTV-DT2

=== Subchannels ===
The station's signal is multiplexed:

Subchannels of KKTV
Subchannel	Res.	Short name	Programming
11.1	1080i	KKTV-HD	CBS
11.2	480i	METV-KK	MeTV & MyNetworkTV
11.3	480i	Outlaw	Outlaw

KKTV began broadcasting a digital signal on channel 10 in 2003.

On September 5, 2006, KKTV launched a subchannel carrying MyNetworkTV programming, under the branding "MyKKTV". KKTV-DT2 is carried on cable channel 41 in Colorado Springs and cable channel 246 in Pueblo. When the channel first launched it carried replays and extra runs of KKTV's syndicated programming (such as Jeopardy! and Wheel of Fortune) and some exclusive syndicated shows such as Futurama and 30 Rock. At one point, KKTV produced a 9 p.m. newscast for the subchannel. As of September 8, 2015, KKTV-DT2 began airing select programming from MeTV alongside syndicated programming. By October 2019, MeTV took up a bulk of the schedule outside of MyNetworkTV programming, with the service moving to the graveyard slot, airing from 2 to 4 a.m. on Tuesdays through Saturdays, an increasingly common fate for the service.

From October 2007 to January 2010, KKTV broadcast a 24-hour weather channel called "KKTV No Wait Weather" on digital channel 11.3 and area cable providers. The channel began as a time filler service on KKTV digital channel 11.2. No Wait Weather was also seen on 11.2 overnights but this was discontinued in June 2009. On January 1, 2010, this service was discontinued and KKTV-DT3 was removed from Cable 140.

=== Analog-to-digital conversion ===
KKTV shut down its analog signal, over VHF channel 11, on June 12, 2009, the official date on which full-power television stations in the United States transitioned from analog to digital broadcasts under federal mandate. The station's digital signal remained on its pre-transition VHF channel 10, using virtual channel 11.

On January 21, 2011, KKTV began broadcasting on UHF channel 49 and discontinued its broadcast on VHF channel 10 at noon on January 24. Moving to the UHF dial was deemed necessary because of viewer reception (all other Springs area commercial stations were on UHF by 2009) and interference issues with the VHF broadcast.

On June 6, 2019, KKTV switched frequencies from RF channel 49 to RF channel 26 due to the FCC spectrum repack.

=== Translators ===
- K36LB-D Cheyenne Wells
- K13ZI-D Colorado Springs
- K17MI-D Eads, etc.
- K35JS-D Lamar
- K25LE-D Las Animas
- K31IV-D Romeo
- K07BW-D Westcliffe
