= Channel 83 =

North American television channel number

Channel 83 was removed from television use in 1982. The highest frequency to have been used for NTSC-M terrestrial TV broadcasting, it was formerly used by a handful of television stations in North America which broadcast on 884-890 MHz. In the United States, channels 70–83 served primarily as a "translator band" for low-power repeater transmitters filling gaps in coverage for existing stations. Many are defunct, with the few still in existence now moved to lower frequencies:

- CFQC-TV (CTV Saskatoon) rebroadcaster CFQC-TV-3 Richmond Lake, Saskatchewan is no longer on the air.
- KARE (NBC Minneapolis) rebroadcaster K83AE Redwood Falls, Minnesota moved to K68BJ channel 68.
- KLBK-TV (CBS Lubbock) rebroadcaster K83AQ Matador, Texas moved to K47GE channel 47.
- KHQ-TV (NBC Spokane) rebroadcaster K83AJ Quincy, Washington moved to K48BY channel 48
- KOAT-TV (ABC Albuquerque) rebroadcasters K83BK Carrizozo, New Mexico moved to K43BT channel 43 and K83BL Montoya-Newkirk moved to K57BR channel 57.
- KPNX (NBC Phoenix) rebroadcaster K83AC Globe, Arizona moved to K61FB channel 61.
- KRDO-TV (ABC Colorado Springs) rebroadcaster K83BP Deora, Colorado moved to K49BT channel 49.
- KRQE (CBS Albuquerque) rebroadcaster K83AB Santa Rosa, New Mexico moved to K38HR channel 38.
- KSAT-TV (ABC San Antonio) rebroadcaster K83BO Uvalde, Texas moved to K65EQ channel 65.
- KSL-TV (CBS Salt Lake City) rebroadcaster K83AF Delta, Utah moved to K39FR channel 39.
- KTTC (NBC Rochester, Minnesota) rebroadcaster W83AH La Crosse, Wisconsin moved to W67CH channel 67 (now W34FC-D, channel 34).
- KUED-TV (PBS Salt Lake City) rebroadcasters K83BB Duchesne, Utah moved to K03CN channel 3, K83BD Marysvale, Utah moved to K46FX channel 46 and K83BC Virgin, Utah moved to K25HB channel 25.
- WXXW-TV (later WYCC PBS Chicago) had used a small channel 83 rebroadcaster from 1965 to 1972. The main channel 20 transmitter moved to the Sears Tower once that building was completed in May 1973, rendering the fill-in repeater signal unnecessary.
- A RadioShack device, the Multiple Video Distribution System (15-1284 or 150–1284), was marketed in the early-1980s with the capability of block conversion of up to three independent RF modulator signals from VHF channel 3/4 for home viewing on any of channels 74/75, 78/79 and/or 82/83 - channels which remained unused in most markets. Later versions of the product were forced to lower frequencies by the removal of UHF channels 70-83 from television receivers after 1982.
