= KTVX =

Television station in Salt Lake City

- Salt Lake City, Utah; United States
- Channels: Digital: 30 (UHF); Virtual: 4
- Branding: ABC 4 Utah; ABC 4 News

Programming
- Affiliations: 4.1: ABC; for others, see § Subchannels

Ownership
- Owner: Nexstar Media Group; (Nexstar Media Inc.)
- Sister stations: KUCW

History
- First air date: April 19, 1948
- Former call signs: KDYL-TV (1948–1954); KTVT (1954–1959); KCPX-TV (1959–1975)
- Former channel numbers: Analog: 4 (VHF, 1948–2009); Digital: 40 (UHF, 1999–2018)
- Former affiliations: NBC (1948–1960)
- Call sign meaning: "Television Excellence"

Technical information
- Licensing authority: FCC
- Facility ID: 68889
- ERP: 390 kW
- HAAT: 1,256 m (4,121 ft)
- Transmitter coordinates: 40°39′33″N 112°12′10″W
- Translator(s): see § Translators

Links
- Public license information: Public file; LMS
- Website: www.abc4.com

KTVX (channel 4) is a television station in Salt Lake City, Utah, United States, affiliated with ABC. It is owned by Nexstar Media Group alongside CW station KUCW (channel 30). The two stations share studios on West 1700 South in Salt Lake City; KTVX's transmitter is located atop Farnsworth Peak in the Oquirrh Mountains.

KTVX has a large network of broadcast translators that extend its over-the-air coverage throughout Utah, as well as portions of Idaho, Nevada and Wyoming.

== History ==
KTVX traces its history back to the November 1946 sign-on of W6XIS, the first television station in Utah, which operated under an experimental broadcast license. The station began regular broadcasts on April 19, 1948 as KDYL-TV; it was originally owned by Sid Fox and his Mountain Broadcasting Corporation along with KDYL radio (1320 AM, now KNIT, and 98.7 FM, now KBEE). The floor in the original studio facility was sloped and cameras would easily roll. The station's original transmitter sat atop the Walker Bank Building. Channel 4 originally operated as an NBC affiliate owing to KDYL-AM's longtime affiliation with the NBC Red Network. In addition, the station also shared ABC programming with CBS affiliate KSL-TV (channel 5, now an NBC affiliate) until KUTV (channel 2) signed on in September 1954 as a full-time ABC affiliate. KTVX is the oldest television station located in the Mountain Time Zone and the third oldest station located west of the Mississippi River. It was also the first independently owned television station to sign-on in the United States. Fox sold the KDYL stations to Time-Life in 1953, earning a handsome return on his purchase of KDYL radio in 1926. Time-Life changed its call letters to KTVT in 1954 (the KTVT call letters are now used on the CBS owned-and-operated station in Dallas–Fort Worth).

Its call letters later changed to KCPX-TV in 1959 following its sale to Screen Gems Broadcasting (a division of Screen Gems, then the television division of Columbia Pictures). Some notable local programs during channel 4's early years included the children's programs Hotel Balderdash (which debuted on September 11, 1972) and Fireman Frank, and horror film showcase Nightmare Theater; the latter two programs were both hosted by Ron Ross. At this time, the station was using an "Open 4" logo that was later implemented by WAPA-TV in San Juan, Puerto Rico (that station used several variations of the logo from the 1970s until implementing a new logo in 1987).

The station swapped affiliations with KUTV in 1960 and became an ABC affiliate. KTVX by then had become the first television station in Utah to broadcast in color and was one of the first ABC affiliates to broadcast in color.

The station adopted its present-day KTVX call letters in October 1975 (which were previously used by fellow ABC affiliate KTUL-TV in Tulsa, Oklahoma, from 1954 to 1957), when United Television—then the broadcasting division of 20th Century Fox—acquired the station. In 1981, United Television merged with Chris-Craft Industries.

In late 1994, CBS and Westinghouse Broadcasting announced a complex ownership trade with NBC. KUTV and KCNC-TV in Denver, which were owned by NBC at the time (the former station had recently been purchased by the network), were traded to Westinghouse in exchange for WCAU in Philadelphia; this came about after Westinghouse signed an affiliation deal with CBS which would cause KYW-TV and two other stations to switch to the network. NBC approached KTVX for an affiliation deal, but the station would renew its affiliation contract with ABC; as a result, it signed an affiliation deal with KSL-TV, which took effect on September 10, 1995.

Chris-Craft's television stations were sold to Fox Television Stations (a subsidiary of News Corporation) on August 12, 2000, which was finalized July 31, 2001. Since Fox already owned KSTU (channel 13), it was forced to sell KTVX due to Federal Communications Commission (FCC) regulations prohibiting one company from owning two of the four highest-rated stations in a single market, as well as the fact that the station was in the middle of a long-term affiliation contract with ABC. KTVX and KMOL (now WOAI-TV) in San Antonio were subsequently traded to Clear Channel Communications (now iHeartMedia) in exchange for WFTC, as Fox also wanted to offer an attractive package to Clear Channel for the latter station. KTVX was the only Chris-Craft owned station to have no affiliation with UPN during the time that the company owned a partial stake in the network.

In August 2005, President George W. Bush visited Salt Lake City to speak to the Veterans of Foreign Wars. Cindy Sheehan appeared in a paid political message protesting the Iraq War and the ad was submitted to the four major network stations in the market (KSL-TV, KSTU, KTVX and KUTV). KTVX management declined the offer saying that "the content could very well be offensive to our community in Utah, which has contributed more than its fair share of fighting soldiers and suffered significant loss of life in this Iraq war."

A blue variant of the KTVX logo used from 2007 to 2013, when it was replaced with the current version.

On November 16, 2006, Clear Channel announced plans to sell all of its television stations, including KTVX, after being bought by private equity firms. On April 20, 2007, Clear Channel sold its television station group to Providence Equity Partners's Newport Television. That company closed on the station group on March 14, 2008. In May, Newport Television agreed to sell KTVX and five other stations to High Plains Broadcasting because of ownership conflicts. Newport would have continued to operate KTVX through a joint sales agreement after the sale was finalized. However, on August 22, KTVX was removed from the sale after Univision Communications, owner of KUTH (channel 32) and of which Providence Equity Partners holds a 19 percent stake, canceled its plans to purchase KUTF (channel 12) in Logan thus alleviating the need to sell KTVX (although sister station KUCW was eventually sold to High Plains Broadcasting due to FCC single-market ownership limits but continued to be managed by Newport Television). KUTF has since been sold to the Daystar Television Network.

On July 19, 2012, Newport Television sold 22 of its 27 stations to the Nexstar Broadcasting Group, Sinclair Broadcast Group and Cox Media Group. KTVX and KUCW were among the twelve that would be sold to Nexstar, which acquired both stations outright. The JSA and SSA between KTVX and KUCW was terminated upon the completion of the sale, which occurred on December 3, as both stations officially became co-owned for the first time since Clear Channel sold the pair back in 2008. The purchases of KTVX and KUCW would also mark a re-entry into Utah for Nexstar, which had managed CBS affiliate KUTV and MyNetworkTV affiliate KMYU (channel 12) under a groupwide agreement with the Four Points Media Group before that company's stations were sold to Sinclair at the beginning of 2012. WOAI-TV, which has been a sister station to KTVX since United Television acquired both stations in 1975, was one of the Newport stations sold to Sinclair, which resulted in the two stations coming under entirely separate ownership and management for the first time in over 37 years; as a result, WOAI is now sister to rival KUTV.

On December 3, 2018, Nexstar announced it would acquire the assets of Chicago-based Tribune Media—which has owned Fox affiliate KSTU (channel 13) since December 2013—for $6.4 billion in cash and debt. Because KTVX and KSTU rank as two of the four highest-rated stations in the Salt Lake City market, Nexstar could not acquire KSTU directly or indirectly; any attempt by Nexstar to indirectly assume the operations of KSTU through local marketing or shared services agreements could have raised additional regulatory hurdles that would have delayed closing the merger. As such, on January 31, 2019, Nexstar announced it would retain the KTVX/KUCW duopoly and sell KSTU to a different buyer; it was announced on March 20 that KSTU would be sold to the E. W. Scripps Company.

=== Analog-to-digital conversion ===
KTVX became the first television station in Utah to broadcast a digital signal and the first to broadcast network programming in high-definition in 2000. The station shut down its analog signal, over VHF channel 4, on June 12, 2009, as part of the federally mandated transition from analog to digital television. The station's digital signal remained on its pre-transition UHF channel 40, using virtual channel 4.

On September 9, 2018, KTVX moved its frequency, from channel 40 to channel 30.

== News operation ==
KTVX presently broadcasts 32 hours of locally produced newscasts each week (with six hours each weekday and two hours each on Saturdays and Sundays). In addition, KTVX produces a local lifestyle and entertainment program called Good Things Utah, which airs weekday mornings at 9 a.m.; and the public affairs program, On the Record, which airs on Sunday mornings. On April 26, 2010, KTVX became the third television station in the Salt Lake City market to begin broadcasting its local newscasts in high definition; with the conversion came the introduction of a new HD-compatible news set and graphics package.

In September 2010, the station began expanding its local news programming. Its weekday morning newscast, Good Morning Utah, expanded to 2 1/2 hours from 4:30 to 7 a.m. with a two-hour extension of the program being added to sister station KUCW (the 7–9 a.m. block on channel 30 was canceled in 2012). KTVX added a weekday afternoon newscast at 4 p.m. and began producing a half-hour 9 p.m. newscast for KUCW. In addition, KUCW debuted a KTVX-produced local entertainment program called The Daily Dish on September 7, 2010 (which has since been moved to KTVX and was converted into an hour-long midday newscast at 11 a.m.). KUCW's 9 p.m. newscast ended on December 9, 2011, due to low ratings; the move was concurrent with other changes at KTVX, including the expansion of the 4 p.m. newscast to an hour on January 9, 2012.

=== Sponsored content controversy ===
In 2021, the station was tricked into promoting a fake sexual wellness product, "invented" by a team working for late-night political commentary show Last Week Tonight with John Oliver, called the "Venus Veil", which was actually just a blanket; the show's team paid KTVX $1,750 to feature the fake product and an interview with its "creator" as a way to illustrate how stations such as KTVX promote sponsored content without being upfront about the sponsorship, essentially passing off advertising as news.

== Technical information ==
=== Subchannels ===
The station's signal is multiplexed:

Subchannels of KTVX
Subchannel	Res.	Short name	Programming
4.1	720p	KTVX-HD	ABC
4.2	480i	ANT-TV	Antenna TV
4.3	480i	Rewind	Rewind TV
4.4	480i	Outlaw	Outlaw
14.3	480i	ROAR	Roar (KJZZ-TV)
14.5	480i	Nest	The Nest (KJZZ-TV)

Broadcast on behalf of another station

In early 2008, KTVX carried "TheHive TV" on its second digital subchannel, which featured locally produced programs by Salt Lake City area residents and sports. The schedule resembled a public access cable channel; however, because the subchannel had to conform to FCC content guidelines, externally produced programs were approved by the station before they were broadcast. This service shut down in December 2008 and was replaced in January 2009 by Untamed Sports TV, which KTVX-DT2 served as its flagship station.

In April 2011, KTVX began carrying TheCoolTV music video network on its 4.2 subchannel. KTVX replaced TheCoolTV with MeTV on July 30, 2012.

On September 1, 2016, KTVX replaced WeatherNation on digital 4.3 with Laff.

On November 1, 2018, KTVX replaced a standard definition simulcast of KUCW on digital 4.3 with Heroes & Icons on digital 4.4.

On September 1, 2021, KTVX replaced Laff on digital 4.3 with Rewind TV.

On November 1, 2022, KTVX replaced Heroes & Icons on digital 4.4 with TheGrio.

In 2024, KTVX replaced TheGrio with The Nest. Later that year, they replaced it with Outlaw.

On July 29, 2025, KTVX replaced MeTV on digital 4.2 with Antenna TV.

=== Translators ===
KTVX extends its coverage throughout the entire state of Utah plus parts of Arizona, Colorado, Idaho, Nevada and Wyoming using a network of more than 100 community-owned translators listed below. As a result of the June 2009 transition to digital broadcasting, a few of these translators have converted to also digital-only broadcasts. However, only full-powered television stations were required to make the switch.

- Enterprise: K05BU-D
- Cedar Canyon: K06JA-D
- Ely−McGill, NV: K07DU-D
- Ruth, NV: K07DV-D
- Lund−Preston, NV: K08CB-D
- Long Valley Junction: K08PX-D
- Sigurd−Salina: K08QC-D
- Woodland−Kamas: K08QD-D
- Roosevelt, etc.: K08QH-D
- East Price: K08QF-D
- Hildale, etc.: K09SU-D
- Laketown, etc.: K10LM-D
- Cedar City: K11CQ-D
- Pine Valley, etc.: K11OO-D
- Mink Creek, ID: K11WF-D
- Aurora, etc.: K12XD-D
- Virgin: K13QK-D
- Peoa−Oakley: K14PF-D
- Malad, ID: K14RY-D
- Teasdale−Torrey: K15KU-D
- Richfield, etc.: K15KY-D
- Rural Sevier County: K15KT-D
- Koosharen: K15KZ-D
- Panguitch: K15LA-D
- Henrieville: K15LC-D
- Fruitland: K15LO-D
- Green River: K16HD-D
- Rural Garfield County: K16LZ-D
- Cedar City: K16MS-D
- Orangeville: K16MZ-D
- Hatch: K17HQ-D
- Huntsville, etc.: K17IP-D
- Mayfield: K17JE-D
- Rural Beaver County: K18FU-D
- Scipio−Holden: K18MV-D
- Myton: K19EY-D
- Mount Pleasant: K19GN-D
- Montezuma Creek−Aneth: K19HU-D
- Navajo Mountain School, etc.: K20JE-D
- Oljeto: K20JF-D
- Orderville: K20MF-D
- Leamington: K20NM-D
- Eureka, NV: K21GJ-D
- Circleville: K21IB-D
- Nephi: K21JZ-D
- Kanarraville:, etc. K22NB-D
- Bluff: K23KC-D
- Eureka, NV: K23LF-D
- Mexican Hat: K23MT-D
- St. George: K23NY-D
- Price, etc.: K24HP-D
- Marysvale: K24MQ-D
- Summit County: K24MU-D
- Overton, NV: K24NE-D
- Duckwater, NV: K26JY-D
- Helper: K26LR-D
- Elko, NV: K26OE-D
- Washington: K28EA-D
- Fishlake Resort: K28OQ-D
- Henefer, etc.: K28OU-D
- Fillmore, etc.: K28PC-D
- Hanksville: K29LX-D
- Vernal, etc.: K30KM-D
- Beowawe, NV: K30LB-D
- Alton: K30OE-D
- Escalante: K30OR-D
- Logan: K30OY-D
- Beaver, etc.: K30PH-D
- Heber−Midway: K31FP-D
- Park City: K31FQ-D
- Preston, ID: K31FR-D
- Toquerville: K31IS-D
- Morgan, etc.: K31IU-D
- Duchesne: K31JC-D
- Manila, etc.: K31JP-D
- Garrison, etc.: K31OM-D
- Kanab: K32DC-D
- Elko, NV: K32GK-D
- Hanna, etc.: K32HP-D
- Boulder: K32HQ-D
- Fountain Green: K32JB-D
- Rural Garfield County: K32ML-D
- Capitol Reef National Park: K32MO-D
- Fremont: K32MQ-D
- Caineville: K32MP-D
- Tropic, etc.: K32MT-D
- Samak: K32MZ-D
- Modena, etc.: K32ND-D
- Montpelier, ID: K33DR-D
- Scofield: K33JI-D
- Blanding−Monticello: K33OY-D
- Cortez, etc., CO: K33QG-D
- Parowan−Enoch, etc.: K34AG-D
- Ely, NV: K34CM-D
- Apple Valley: K34CX-D
- Randolph−Woodruff: K34FR-D
- Manti, etc.: K34OE-D
- Coalville: K34OK-D
- Spring Glen: K34PD-D
- Delta, etc.−Oak City, etc.: K35NU-D
- Emery: K35OA-D
- Green River: K35OB-D
- Ferron: K35OC-D
- Clear Creek: K35OD-D
- Huntington: K35OE-D
- Antimony: K36IG-D
- Wanship: K36OV-D
