= Channel 70 =

Former television channel

Channel 70 was removed from television use in 1983, but was formerly used by television stations in North America which broadcast on 806-812 MHz. In the United States, channels 70-83 served primarily as a "translator band" containing repeater transmitters to fill gaps in coverage for existing stations. Many are now defunct, the rest were to have been moved to lower frequencies:

- KTTC (NBC Rochester, Minnesota) licenses to operate repeaters K70DR Blue Earth and K79BK Fairmont, Minnesota (channels 70 and 79 respectively) were renewed by the US Federal Communications Commission in 1999 but were off the air by the end of 2011.
- NTIA had listed K70DR and K70FL (both on analog channel 70) among the LPTV operations to be unaffected by the 2009 US ATSC digital television transition, based on license information current as of 2008. These two channel 70 repeaters were the last to remain licensed anywhere in the channel 70-83 range; as noted above, K70DR went dark at the end of 2011; K70FL moved to channel 23 and subsequently went dark.
- CJBR-TV (Radio-Canada Rimouski) rebroadcaster CJEX-TV Estcourt, signed on in 1958 but is no longer on the air. Estcourt is now served directly by CKRT-TV, an affiliate station in Rivière-du-Loup.
- KAMR-TV (NBC Amarillo) rebroadcasters K70CF Canadian, Texas, K70DA Childress, Texas and K70DB Clarendon, Texas were moved to be K29BR channel 29, K46CN channel 46 and K47BQ channel 47 respectively.
- KATU (ABC Portland) rebroadcaster K70BM Hood River, Oregon moved to K50CE channel 50.
- KGIN-TV (CBS Lincoln) rebroadcasters K70DK Cambridge, Nebraska and K70DP Gothenburg, Nebraska were moved to K30FV channel 30 and K28GC channel 28 respectively.
- KGW (NBC Portland) rebroadcaster K70EH Corvallis, Oregon moved to K26AY channel 26.
- KMSP-TV (Fox Minneapolis) rebroadcaster K70EU Olivia, Minnesota moved to K55CK channel 55.
- KOAT-TV (ABC Albuquerque) rebroadcaster K70BR Durango, Colorado moved to K45DH channel 45.
- KOB-TV (NBC Albuquerque) rebroadcasters K70AE Truth or Consequences, New Mexico and K70AZ Gallup, New Mexico were moved to K51BQ channel 51 (now K29LC-D, channel 29) and K67BP channel 67 respectively.
- KOBI (NBC Medford) rebroadcaster K70AU Cave Junction, Oregon moved to K07PZ channel 7.
- KPTV (Fox TV Portland) rebroadcasters K70CV Rockaway, Oregon and K70EX Maupin, Oregon were moved to K20HT channel 20 and K60CH channel 60 respectively.
- KREM-TV (CBS Spokane) rebroadcaster K70BA Lewiston, Idaho moved to K21CC channel 21.
- KSL-TV (NBC Salt Lake City) rebroadcasters K70AR Castle Dale, Utah, K70AT Ely, Nevada and K70AV/K70CN Myton, Utah were moved to K24FI channel 24, K34CM channel 34 (now K34CM-D) and K21FT (now K21FT-D) channel 21 respectively.
- KSPS-TV (PBS Spokane) rebroadcaster K70EP Quincy, Washington moved to K50BO channel 50.
- KUED (PBS Salt Lake City) rebroadcaster K70DO Ephraim, Utah moved to K33FT channel 33.
- KUTV (CBS Salt Lake City) rebroadcasters K70BD Fillmore, Utah and K70EB Little America, Wyoming were moved to K36FY channel 36 and K27DZ channel 27 respectively.
- KWGN-TV (CW Network Denver) rebroadcaster K70AK Saratoga, Wyoming moved to K11ER channel 11.
- WAND 17 Decatur, Illinois once operated a repeater W70AF serving Champaign-Urbana on this frequency. That area is now served by a WAND-TV repeater in Danville, Illinois.
- WCCO-TV (CBS Minneapolis) rebroadcaster K70BB Redwood Falls, Minnesota moved to K62AA channel 62.
- WOAI-TV (NBC San Antonio) rebroadcaster K70FD Leakey, Texas moved to K43GC channel 43.
- WUSA-TV (CBS Washington) rebroadcaster W70AE Moorefield, West Virginia moved to W50BD channel 50.
