= Channel 20 low-power TV stations in the United States =

The following low-power television stations broadcast on digital or analog channel 20 in the United States:

- K20AC-D in Alexandria, Minnesota
- K20BP-D in Phillips County, Montana
- K20BR-D in Gage, etc., Oklahoma
- K20CN-D in Fortuna/Rio Dell, California
- K20CV-D in Raton, New Mexico
- K20DD-D in Albany, etc., Oregon
- K20DE-D in Alturas/Likely, California
- K20DN-D in Wichita Falls, Texas
- K20EH-D in Hood River, Oregon
- K20FR-D in Hawthorne, Nevada
- K20FS-D in Peetz, Colorado
- K20GG-D in Duncan, Arizona
- K20GH-D in Milford, etc., Utah
- K20GJ-D in Bloomington, Utah
- K20GK-D in Pleasant Valley, Colorado
- K20GQ-D in Las Vegas, New Mexico
- K20GT-D in Indian Village, New Mexico
- K20HA-D in Caballo, New Mexico
- K20HB-D in Billings, Montana
- K20HM-D in Idalia, Colorado
- K20HT-D in Rockaway Beach, Oregon
- K20ID-D in Kingman, Arizona
- K20IJ-D in Wauneta, Nebraska
- K20IR-D in Cottage Grove, Oregon
- K20IT-D in Boise City, Oklahoma
- K20IV-D in Baker City, etc., Oregon
- K20JB-D in Hollis, Oklahoma
- K20JD-D in Cherokee & Alva, Oklahoma
- K20JE-D in Navajo Mtn. Sch., Etc., Utah
- K20JF-D in Oljeto, Utah
- K20JG-D in Salida, etc., Colorado
- K20JL-D in Ellensburg, etc., Washington
- K20JQ-D in Wells, Nevada
- K20JS-D in Glasgow, Montana
- K20JV-D in Overton, Nevada
- K20JW-D in Jacks Cabin, Colorado
- K20JX-D in Sacramento, California
- K20JY-D in Olivia, Minnesota
- K20JZ-D in Green River, Utah
- K20KB-D in Huntington, Utah
- K20KC-D in Mexican Hat, etc., Utah
- K20KF-D in Davenport, Iowa
- K20KG-D in Pasco, Washington
- K20KJ-D in Bryan, Texas
- K20KL-D in Drummond, Montana
- K20KO-D in Julesburg, Colorado
- K20KQ-D in Livingston, etc., Montana
- K20KT-D in Dora, New Mexico
- K20KU-D in Montpelier, Idaho
- K20KV-D in Medford, Oregon
- K20KW-D in Saint Cloud, Minnesota
- K20LD-D in Ely, Nevada
- K20LF-D in Wendover, Utah
- K20LH-D in Ridgecrest, California
- K20LK-D in Colstrip, etc., Montana
- K20LL-D in Reedsport, Oregon
- K20LP-D in St. James, Minnesota
- K20LQ-D in Yakima, Washington
- K20LT-D in Diamond Basin, Etc., Wyoming
- K20MC-D in Pahrump, Nevada
- K20MF-D in Orderville, Utah
- K20MH-D in Duncan, Oklahoma
- K20MJ-D in Milton-Freewater, Oregon
- K20MK-D in Roseburg, Oregon
- K20ML-D in Parks, etc., Arizona
- K20MM-D in New Orleans, Louisiana
- K20MN-D in Red Lake, Minnesota
- K20MP-D in Lamar, Colorado
- K20MQ-D in Rexburg, Idaho
- K20MR-D in Garfield, etc., Utah
- K20MS-D in Richfield, etc., Utah
- K20MT-D in Mount Pleasant, Utah
- K20MU-D in Bicknell, etc., Utah
- K20MV-D in Koosharem, Utah
- K20MW-D in Rural Sevier County, Utah
- K20MX-D in Panguitch, etc., Utah
- K20MY-D in Henriville, Utah
- K20MZ-D in Mayfield, Utah
- K20NA-D in Hatch, Utah
- K20NB-D in Circleville, Utah
- K20NC-D in Logan, Utah
- K20ND-D in Summit County, Utah
- K20NE-D in North Platte, Nebraska
- K20NF-D in Seattle, Washington
- K20NH-D in Brainerd, Minnesota
- K20NI-D in Akron, Colorado
- K20NJ-D in Elk City, Oklahoma
- K20NK-D in Cedar City, Utah
- K20NL-D in Grays River/Lebam, Washington
- K20NM-D in Leamington, Utah
- K20NN-D in Scipio, Utah
- K20NP-D in Spring Glen, Utah
- K20NQ-D in Orangeville, Utah
- K20NR-D in International Falls, Minnesota
- K20NT-D in McDermitt, Nevada
- K20NU-D in Tabiona & Myton, Utah
- K20NV-D in Fruitland, Utah
- K20NW-D in Laughlin, Nevada
- K20NX-D in Hilo, Hawaii
- K20NZ-D in Garden Valley, Idaho
- K20OB-D in Nephi, Utah
- K20OC-D in El Dorado, Arkansas
- K20OD-D in Valmy, Nevada
- K20OE-D in Silt, Colorado
- K20OF-D in Malad, Idaho
- K20OG-D in Cortez, etc., Colorado
- K20OH-D in Ardmore, Oklahoma
- K20OL-D in Fort Smith, Arkansas
- K20OM-D in Beaumont, Texas
- K20OO-D in Ceres, California
- K20PB-D in Williston, North Dakota
- K20PC-D in Centerville, Texas
- KABY-LD in Sioux Falls, South Dakota
- KADF-LD in Austin, Texas
- KBOP-LD in Dallas-Ft Worth, Texas
- KBVK-LD in Spencer, Iowa
- KBZC-LD in Oklahoma City, Oklahoma
- KCWF-LP in Las Cruces, New Mexico
- KCWQ-LD in Palm Springs, California
- KDNF-LD in Arvada, Colorado, uses KRMT's full-power spectrum
- KEFN-CD in St. Louis, Missouri
- KHPM-CD in San Marcos, Texas
- KJCT-LP in Grand Junction, Colorado
- KJNM-LD in Fayetteville, Arkansas
- KLRA-CD in Little Rock, Arkansas
- KMBA-LD in Austin, Texas
- KMBD-LD in Minneapolis, Minnesota
- KMBH-LD in McAllen, Texas
- KNMQ-LD in Albuquerque, New Mexico
- KOXI-CD in Portland, Oregon
- KQRE-LD in Bend, Oregon
- KRTX-LP in San Antonio, Texas
- KSZG-LD in Aspen, Colorado
- KTFT-LD in Twin Falls, Idaho
- KTLE-LD in Odessa, Texas
- KTMJ-CD in Topeka, Kansas
- KTSH-CD in Shreveport, Louisiana
- KUVM-CD in Missouri City, Texas
- KWSM-LD in Santa Maria, California
- KXFX-CD in Brownsville, Texas
- KXTU-LD in Colorado Springs, Colorado
- KZCZ-LD in College Station, Texas
- KZSD-LP in San Diego, California
- KZTN-LD in Boise, Idaho
- KZUP-CD in Baton Rouge, Louisiana
- W20AD-D in Williamsport, Pennsylvania
- W20CP-D in Mansfield, Pennsylvania
- W20CQ-D in Hempstead, New York
- W20DF-D in Russellville, Alabama
- W20DL-D in Macon, Georgia
- W20DQ-D in Luquillo, Puerto Rico
- W20DR-D in Humacao, Puerto Rico
- W20DS-D in Caguas, Puerto Rico
- W20DT-D in Vanderbilt, Michigan
- W20DW-D in Clarksdale, Mississippi
- W20DX-D in Panama City, Florida
- W20DY-D in Roanoke, West Virginia
- W20EH-D in Pownal, etc., Vermont
- W20EI-D in Towanda, Pennsylvania
- W20EK-D in Andrews, etc., North Carolina
- W20EM-D in New Bern, North Carolina
- W20EQ-D in Athens, Georgia
- W20ER-D in Bangor, Maine
- W20EU-D in Chambersburg, Pennsylvania
- W20EV-D in Houghton Lake, Michigan
- W20EW-D in Augusta, Georgia
- W20EY-D in Wilmington, North Carolina
- WANN-CD in Atlanta, Georgia
- WBGH-CA in Binghamton, New York
- WBII-CD in Holly Springs, Mississippi
- WCGZ-LD in Lanett, Alabama
- WDMC-LD in Charlotte, North Carolina
- WDME-CD in Washington, D.C.
- WDNN-CD in Dalton, Georgia
- WFUN-LD in Miami, Florida, uses WLMF-LD's spectrum
- WHDS-LD in Savannah, Georgia
- WJJN-LD in Dothan, Alabama
- WKBJ-LD in Live Oak, Florida
- WKUT-LD in Bowling Green, Kentucky
- WLMF-LD in Miami, Florida
- WNGJ-LD in Ogdensburg, New York
- WNYK-LD in Teaneck, New Jersey
- WOCX-LD in Reddick, Florida
- WOHZ-CD in Mansfield, Ohio
- WOVA-LD in Parkersburg, West Virginia
- WQAW-LD in Lake Shore, Maryland
- WSHM-LD in Springfield, Massachusetts
- WSWY-LD in Indianapolis, Indiana
- WTCL-LD in Cleveland, Ohio
- WTSN-CD in Evansville, Indiana
- WWHC-LD in Olean, New York
- WWME-CD in Chicago, Illinois
- WZXZ-CD in Orlando, etc., Florida

The following low-power stations, which are no longer licensed, formerly broadcast on digital or analog channel 20:

- K10PB-D in Montezuma Creek/Aneth, Utah
- K20BI-D in Nesika Beach, Oregon
- K20CP-D in Elmo, Montana
- K20ES in Pendleton, etc., Oregon
- K20GP in Orangeville, Utah
- K20GU in Ruidoso, etc., New Mexico
- K20HO in Lawton, Oklahoma
- K20HX in Beowawe, Nevada
- K20HZ in Palm Springs, California
- K20IA in Prescott, Arizona
- K20IM-D in Barstow, California
- K20KI-D in Rapid City, South Dakota
- KADX-LP in Andrews, Texas
- KAKH-LD in Lufkin, Texas
- KAQC-LP in Atlanta, Texas
- KEXT-CD in San Jose, California
- KOKT-LP in Sulphur, Oklahoma
- KSSY-LP in Arroyo Grande, California
- KTUD-CD in Las Vegas, Nevada
- KUAM-LP in Tamuning, Guam
- W20CM in Port Jervis, New York
- W20CY in Tifton, Georgia
- WAZF-CD in Front Royal, Virginia
- WCZC-LD in Augusta, Georgia
- WDUE-LD in Eau Claire, Wisconsin
- WDZA-LD in Wilmington, North Carolina
- WOTH-CD in Cincinnati, Ohio
- WPRU-LP in Aquadilla, Puerto Rico
- WUVI-LD in West Lafayette, Indiana
- WUWB-LD in West Branch, Michigan
