= Channel 20 digital TV stations in the United States =

The following television stations broadcast on digital channel 20 in the United States:

- K20AC-D in Alexandria, Minnesota
- K20BP-D in Phillips County, Montana
- K20BR-D in Gage, etc., Oklahoma
- K20CN-D in Fortuna/Rio Dell, California
- K20CV-D in Raton, New Mexico
- K20DD-D in Albany, etc., Oregon
- K20DE-D in Alturas/Likely, California
- K20DN-D in Wichita Falls, Texas
- K20EH-D in Hood River, Oregon, on virtual channel 49, which rebroadcasts KPDX
- K20FR-D in Hawthorne, Nevada
- K20FS-D in Peetz, Colorado, on virtual channel 7, which rebroadcasts KMGH-TV
- K20GG-D in Duncan, Arizona
- K20GH-D in Milford, etc., Utah
- K20GJ-D in Bloomington, Utah, on virtual channel 5, which rebroadcasts KSL-TV
- K20GK-D in Pleasant Valley, Colorado, on virtual channel 7, which rebroadcasts KMGH-TV
- K20GQ-D in Las Vegas, New Mexico
- K20GT-D in Indian Village, New Mexico
- K20HA-D in Caballo, New Mexico
- K20HB-D in Billings, Montana
- K20HM-D in Idalia, Colorado, on virtual channel 6, which rebroadcasts KRMA-TV
- K20HT-D in Rockaway Beach, Oregon, on virtual channel 12, which rebroadcasts KPTV
- K20ID-D in Kingman, Arizona
- K20IJ-D in Wauneta, Nebraska
- K20IR-D in Cottage Grove, Oregon
- K20IT-D in Boise City, Oklahoma
- K20IV-D in Baker City, etc., Oregon
- K20JB-D in Hollis, Oklahoma
- K20JD-D in Cherokee & Alva, Oklahoma
- K20JE-D in Navajo Mtn. Sch., etc., Utah
- K20JF-D in Oljeto, Utah
- K20JG-D in Salida, etc., Colorado
- K20JL-D in Ellensburg, etc., Washington
- K20JQ-D in Wells, Nevada
- K20JS-D in Glasgow, Montana
- K20JV-D in Overton, Nevada
- K20JW-D in Jacks Cabin, Colorado, on virtual channel 8, which rebroadcasts K06HN-D
- K20JX-D in Sacramento, California, on virtual channel 27
- K20JY-D in Olivia, Minnesota, on virtual channel 10, which rebroadcasts KWCM-TV
- K20JZ-D in Green River, Utah
- K20KB-D in Huntington, Utah
- K20KC-D in Mexican Hat, etc., Utah
- K20KF-D in Davenport, Iowa
- K20KG-D in Pasco, Washington
- K20KJ-D in Bryan, Texas
- K20KL-D in Drummond, Montana
- K20KO-D in Julesburg, Colorado, on virtual channel 3, which rebroadcasts KCDO-TV
- K20KQ-D in Livingston, etc., Montana
- K20KT-D in Dora, New Mexico
- K20KU-D in Montpelier, Idaho
- K20KV-D in Medford, Oregon
- K20KW-D in Saint Cloud, Minnesota
- K20LD-D in Ely, Nevada
- K20LF-D in Wendover, Utah
- K20LH-D in Ridgecrest, California, on virtual channel 64
- K20LK-D in Colstrip, etc., Montana
- K20LL-D in Reedsport, Oregon
- K20LP-D in St. James, Minnesota
- K20LQ-D in Yakima, Washington
- K20LT-D in Diamond Basin, etc., Wyoming
- K20MC-D in Pahrump, Nevada
- K20MF-D in Orderville, Utah
- K20MH-D in Duncan, Oklahoma
- K20MJ-D in Milton-Freewater, Oregon
- K20MK-D in Roseburg, Oregon
- K20ML-D in Parks, etc., Arizona, on virtual channel 8, which rebroadcasts KAET
- K20MM-D in New Orleans, Louisiana
- K20MN-D in Red Lake, Minnesota, on virtual channel 11, which rebroadcasts KRII
- K20MP-D in Lamar, Colorado
- K20MQ-D in Rexburg, Idaho
- K20MR-D in Garfield, etc., Utah
- K20MS-D in Richfield, etc., Utah, on virtual channel 13, which rebroadcasts KSTU
- K20MT-D in Mount Pleasant, Utah, on virtual channel 14, which rebroadcasts KJZZ-TV
- K20MU-D in Bicknell, etc., Utah
- K20MV-D in Koosharem, Utah
- K20MW-D in Rural Sevier County, Utah
- K20MX-D in Panguitch, etc., Utah
- K20MY-D in Henriville, Utah
- K20MZ-D in Mayfield, Utah
- K20NA-D in Hatch, Utah
- K20NB-D in Circleville, Utah
- K20NC-D in Logan, Utah
- K20ND-D in Summit County, Utah
- K20NE-D in North Platte, Nebraska
- K20NF-D in Seattle, Washington
- K20NH-D in Brainerd, Minnesota, on virtual channel 26, which rebroadcasts WFTC
- K20NI-D in Akron, Colorado, on virtual channel 4, which rebroadcasts KCNC-TV
- K20NJ-D in Elk City, Oklahoma
- K20NK-D in Cedar City, Utah, on virtual channel 11, which rebroadcasts KBYU-TV
- K20NL-D in Grays River/Lebam, Washington, on virtual channel 2, which rebroadcasts KATU
- K20NM-D in Leamington, Utah
- K20NN-D in Scipio, Utah
- K20NP-D in Spring Glen, Utah
- K20NQ-D in Orangeville, Utah, on virtual channel 11, which rebroadcasts KBYU-TV
- K20NR-D in International Falls, Minnesota
- K20NT-D in McDermitt, Nevada
- K20NU-D in Tabiona & Myton, Utah
- K20NV-D in Fruitland, Utah
- K20NW-D in Laughlin, Nevada
- K20NX-D in Hilo, Hawaii
- K20NZ-D in Garden Valley, Idaho
- K20OB-D in Nephi, Utah
- K20OC-D in El Dorado, Arkansas
- K20OD-D in Valmy, Nevada
- K20OE-D in Silt, Colorado
- K20OF-D in Malad, Idaho
- K20OG-D in Cortez, etc., Colorado
- K20OH-D in Ardmore, Oklahoma
- K20OL-D in Fort Smith, Arkansas
- K20OM-D in Beaumont, Texas
- K20OO-D in Ceres, California
- K20PB-D in Williston, North Dakota
- K20PC-D in Centerville, Texas
- KABY-LD in Sioux Falls, South Dakota
- KADF-LD in Austin, Texas
- KAVU-TV in Victoria, Texas
- KBLR in Paradise, Nevada
- KBOP-LD in Dallas-Fort Worth, Texas, on virtual channel 20
- KBVK-LD in Spencer, Iowa
- KBZC-LD in Oklahoma City, Oklahoma
- KCWQ-LD in Palm Springs, California
- KDNF-LD in Arvada, Colorado, uses KRMT's spectrum, on virtual channel 44
- KDTV-DT in San Francisco, California, on virtual channel 14
- KEFN-CD in St. Louis, Missouri, on virtual channel 20
- KETV in Omaha, Nebraska
- KFDR in Jefferson City, Missouri
- KFNB in Casper, Wyoming
- KFXK-TV in Longview, Texas
- KHPM-CD in San Marcos, Texas
- KITV in Honolulu, Hawaii
- KJCT-LP in Grand Junction, Colorado
- KJNM-LD in Fayetteville, Arkansas
- KJNP-TV in North Pole, Alaska
- KJRE in Ellendale, North Dakota
- KLRA-CD in Little Rock, Arkansas
- KMBA-LD in Austin, Texas
- KMBD-LD in Minneapolis, Minnesota, on virtual channel 43
- KMBH-LD in McAllen, Texas
- KLTL-TV in Lake Charles, Louisiana
- KNMQ-LD in Albuquerque, New Mexico
- KNSN-TV in Reno, Nevada
- KNVN in Chico, California
- KOXI-CD in Portland, Oregon, on virtual channel 20
- KPAZ-TV in Phoenix, Arizona, on virtual channel 21
- KQCW-DT in Muskogee, Oklahoma
- KQRE-LD in Bend, Oregon
- KREM in Spokane, Washington
- KRMT in Denver, Colorado, on virtual channel 41
- KRMU in Durango, Colorado
- KRTX-LP in San Antonio, Texas
- KSEE in Fresno, California
- KSMQ-TV in Austin, Minnesota
- KSZG-LD in Aspen, Colorado
- KTBY in Anchorage, Alaska
- KTEJ in Jonesboro, Arkansas
- KTFN in El Paso, Texas
- KTFT-LD in Twin Falls, Idaho
- KTLE-LD in Odessa, Texas
- KTMJ-CD in Topeka, Kansas
- KTMW in Salt Lake City, Utah, on virtual channel 20
- KTSF in San Francisco, California, uses KDTV-DT's spectrum, on virtual channel 26
- KTSH-CD in Shreveport, Louisiana
- KTXS-TV in Sweetwater, Texas
- KUVM-CD in Missouri City, Texas, on virtual channel 34
- KVII-TV in Amarillo, Texas
- KVME-TV in Bishop, California
- KWSM-LD in Santa Maria, California
- KXFX-CD in Brownsville, Texas
- KXTU-LD in Colorado Springs, Colorado
- KZCZ-LD in College Station, Texas
- KZSD-LP in San Diego, California, on virtual channel 10, which rebroadcasts KGTV
- KZTN-LD in Boise, Idaho
- KZUP-CD in Baton Rouge, Louisiana
- W20AD-D in Williamsport, Pennsylvania
- W20CP-D in Mansfield, Pennsylvania
- W20CQ-D in Hempstead, New York, on virtual channel 20
- W20DF-D in Russellville, Alabama
- W20DL-D in Macon, Georgia
- W20DQ-D in Luquillo, Puerto Rico, on virtual channel 20
- W20DR-D in Humacao, Puerto Rico, on virtual channel 28
- W20DS-D in Caguas, Puerto Rico, on virtual channel 28
- W20DT-D in Vanderbilt, Michigan
- W20DW-D in Clarksdale, Mississippi
- W20DX-D in Panama City, Florida
- W20DY-D in Roanoke, West Virginia
- W20EH-D in Pownal, etc., Vermont
- W20EI-D in Towanda, Pennsylvania
- W20EJ-D in San Juan, Puerto Rico, on virtual channel 26, which rebroadcasts WOST
- W20EK-D in Andrews, etc., North Carolina
- W20EM-D in New Bern, North Carolina
- W20EQ-D in Athens, Georgia
- W20ER-D in Bangor, Maine
- W20EU-D in Chambersburg, Pennsylvania
- W20EV-D in Houghton Lake, Michigan
- W20EW-D in Augusta, Georgia
- W20EY-D in Wilmington, North Carolina
- WABM in Birmingham, Alabama
- WAND in Decatur, Illinois
- WANN-CD in Atlanta, Georgia, on virtual channel 32
- WBII-CD in Holly Springs, Mississippi
- WBZ-TV in Boston, Massachusetts, on virtual channel 4
- WCAX-TV in Burlington, Vermont
- WCBB in Augusta, Maine
- WCBD-TV in Charleston, South Carolina
- WCGZ-LD in Lanett, Alabama
- WCMW in Manistee, Michigan
- WCNY-TV in Syracuse, New York
- WCTV in Thomasville, Georgia
- WCWJ in Jacksonville, Florida
- WDMC-LD in Charlotte, North Carolina, on virtual channel 25
- WDME-CD in Washington, D.C.
- WDNN-CD in Dalton, Georgia
- WFFT-TV in Fort Wayne, Indiana
- WFUN-LD in Miami, Florida, uses WLMF-LD's spectrum, on virtual channel 48
- WGNT in Portsmouth, Virginia
- WHA-TV in Madison, Wisconsin
- WHDS-LD in Savannah, Georgia
- WHSV-TV in Harrisonburg, Virginia, on virtual channel 3
- WJJN-LD in Dothan, Alabama
- WKBJ-LD in Live Oak, Florida
- WKRG-TV in Mobile, Alabama
- WKUT-LD in Bowling Green, Kentucky
- WLMF-LD in Miami, Florida, on virtual channel 53
- WLWT in Cincinnati, Ohio, on virtual channel 5
- WMPN-TV in Jackson, Mississippi
- WNGJ-LD in Ogdensburg, New York
- WNYK-LD in Teaneck, New Jersey
- WOCX-LD in Reddick, Florida
- WOHZ-CD in Mansfield, Ohio, on virtual channel 19, which rebroadcasts WOIO
- WOST in Mayaguez, Puerto Rico, on virtual channel 14
- WOVA-LD in Parkersburg, West Virginia
- WPGH-TV in Pittsburgh, Pennsylvania, on virtual channel 53
- WQAW-LD in Lake Shore, Maryland, on virtual channel 69
- WRAY-TV in Wake Forest, North Carolina, uses WUNC-TV's spectrum, on virtual channel 30
- WSHM-LD in Springfield, Massachusetts
- WSVI in Christiansted, U.S. Virgin Islands
- WSWY-LD in Indianapolis, Indiana, on virtual channel 21
- WTCL-LD in Cleveland, Ohio
- WTSN-CD in Evansville, Indiana
- WTVS in Detroit, Michigan, on virtual channel 20
- WTVX in Fort Pierce, Florida
- WUNC-TV in Chapel Hill, North Carolina, on virtual channel 4
- WVEA-TV in Tampa, Florida, on virtual channel 50
- WWHC-LD in Olean, New York
- WWME-CD in Chicago, Illinois, on virtual channel 23
- WZTV in Nashville, Tennessee, on virtual channel 17
- WZXZ-CD in Orlando, etc., Florida, on virtual channel 36

The following stations, which are no longer licensed, formerly broadcast on digital channel 20:

- K10PB-D in Montezuma Creek/Aneth, Utah
- K20BI-D in Nesika Beach, Oregon
- K20CP-D in Elmo, Montana
- K20IM-D in Barstow, California
- K20KI-D in Rapid City, South Dakota
- KAKH-LD in Lufkin, Texas
- KEXT-CD in San Jose, California
- KTUD-CD in Las Vegas, Nevada
- WAZF-CD in Front Royal, Virginia
- WCZC-LD in Augusta, Georgia
- WDUE-LD in Eau Claire, Wisconsin
- WDZA-LD in Wilmington, North Carolina
- WOTH-CD in Cincinnati, Ohio
- WUVI-LD in West Lafayette, Indiana
- WUWB-LD in West Branch, Michigan
