= Channel 20 =

Channel 20 or TV20 may refer to several television stations:

== Argentina ==
- Argenvisión in Buenos Aires

== Bolivia ==
- Red UNO in Santa Cruz de la Sierra

== Canada ==
The following television stations operate on virtual channel 20 in Canada:

- CFVS-DT-1, Rouyn-Noranda, Quebec
- CJMT-DT-1, London, Ontario
- CKMI-DT, Quebec City, Quebec

== Israel ==
- Channel 20 (Israel)

== Mexico ==
The following television stations operate on virtual channel 20 in Mexico:

- XHEXT-TDT, Azteca 7 in Mexicali, Baja California
- XHCJH-TDT, Azteca 7 in Ciudad Juárez, Chihuahua
- XHUNAM-TDT, Mexico City
- Sistema Público de Radiodifusión del Estado Mexicano transmitters that carry TV UNAM place it on virtual channel 20

== See also ==
- Channel 20 virtual TV stations in the United States

For UHF frequencies covering 506-512 MHz

- Channel 20 TV stations in Canada
- Channel 20 TV stations in Mexico
- Channel 20 digital TV stations in the United States
- Channel 20 low-power TV stations in the United States
