= List of television stations in Colorado =

This is a list of broadcast television stations licensed to cities in the U.S. state of Colorado.

== Full-power ==
- Stations are arranged by media market served and channel position.

Full-power television stations in Colorado
Media market	Station	Channel	Primary affiliation(s)	Notes	Refs
Colorado Springs	KOAA-TV	5	NBC	(Note: Licensed to Pueblo, Colorado.)	
Colorado Springs	KTSC	8	PBS	(Note: Satellite of KRMA-TV.)	
Colorado Springs	KKTV	11	CBS		
Colorado Springs	KRDO-TV	13	ABC, Telemundo on 13.2		
Colorado Springs	KXRM-TV	21	Fox, The CW on 21.2, Ion Television on 21.3		
Colorado Springs	KVSN-DT	48	Univision, UniMás on 48.2		
Denver	KWGN-TV	2	The CW		
Denver	KCDO-TV	3	Independent	(Note: Licensed to Sterling, Colorado.)	
Denver	KCNC-TV	4	CBS		
Denver	KRMA-TV	6	PBS		
Denver	KMGH-TV	7	ABC		
Denver	KUSA	9	NBC		
Denver	KBDI-TV	12	PBS	(Note: Licensed to Broomfield, Colorado.)	
Denver	KCEC	14	Univision	(Note: Licensed to Boulder, Colorado.)	
Denver	KTVD	20	MyNetworkTV, NBC on 9.4		
Denver	KFCT	22	Fox	(Note: Licensed to Fort Collins, Colorado.) (Note: Satellite of KDVR.)	
Denver	KDEN-TV	25	Telemundo, TeleXitos on 25.2	(Note: Licensed to Longmont, Colorado.)	
Denver	KDVR	31	Fox		
Denver	KPJR-TV	38	TBN	(Note: Licensed to Greeley, Colorado.)	
Denver	KRMT	41	Daystar		
Denver	KTFD-TV	50	UniMás		
Denver	KETD	53	Estrella TV	(Note: Licensed to Castle Rock, Colorado.)	
Denver	KPXC-TV	59	Ion Television		
Durango	KREZ-TV	6	CBS, Fox on 6.2	(Note: Satellite of KRQE.)	
Durango	KRMU	20	PBS		
Durango	KRTN-TV	33	Charge!, Telemundo on 2.1	(Note: Satellite of KTEL-TV.)	
Glenwood Springs	KREG-TV	3	MeTV		
Grand Junction	KFQX	4	Fox, CBS on 4.2		
Grand Junction	KREX-TV	5	CBS, MyNetworkTV on 5.3		
Grand Junction	KKCO	11	NBC, Telemundo on 11.3		
Grand Junction	KRMJ	18	PBS		
Grand Junction	KGBY	20	Cozi TV		
Montrose	KREY-TV	10	CBS, Fox on 10.2	(Note: Satellite of KREX-TV.)	
Steamboat Springs	KMHC	24	Independent		

== Low-power ==
Low-power television stations in Colorado
Media market	Station	Channel	Primary affiliation(s)	Notes	Refs
Aspen	K10RS-D	10	[Blank]		
Aspen	K17OK-D	49	[Blank]	(Note: Licensed to Snowmass Village, Colorado.)	
Aspen	KSZG-LD	20	Silent		
Carbondale	K29CK-D	11	Community, Independent on 12.1		
Colorado Springs	K30JM-D	5	[Blank]		
Colorado Springs	K16KA-D	16	Slient		
Colorado Springs	KZCS-LD	18	Various		
Colorado Springs	KGHB-CD	27	UniMás		
Colorado Springs	KSBK-LD	28	Independent	(Note: Licensed to Walsenburg, Colorado.)	
Colorado Springs	KTLO-LD	46	Telemundo		
Colorado Springs	KWHS-LD	51	CTN		
Colorado Springs	KXTU-LD	57	The CW		
Cortez	K14JS-D	14	Cornerstone TV		
Cortez	K19JA-D	19	eScapes		
Cortez	K21LC-D	21	RFD TV, WGN-TV on 27.5		
Cortez	K26CI-D	27	Various		
Cortez	K28EB-D	28	Various		
Cortez	K30HJ-D	30	Various		
Cortez	K18DR-D	32	Community, Educational independent on 32.3		
Denver	KRDH-LD	5	Various	(Note: Licensed to Cripple Creek, Colorado.)	
Denver	KHDT-LD	11	Outside TV		
Denver	KZDN-LD	16	Various		
Denver	KXDP-LD	17	[Blank]		
Denver	KDEO-LD	23	Religious independent		
Denver	K12XK-D	27	[Blank]		
Denver	KLPD-LD	28	Outside TV		
Denver	KBRO-LD	34	Various		
Denver	KPDD-LD	35	[Blank]		
Denver	KAVC-LD	48	Various		
Denver	KPXH-LD	52	Daystar		
Dolores	K04NK-D	4	[Blank]		
Dolores	K05GA-D	5	[Blank]		
Dolores	K06NT-D	6	[Blank]		
Dolores	K08LL-D	8	[Blank]		
Dolores	K10MZ-D	10	[Blank]		
Dolores	K12QH-D	12	[Blank]		
Dolores	K13AT-D	13	[Blank]		
Durango	K09YK-D	9	The Walk TV		
Durango	K08ET-D	10	Slient		
Durango	K16GZ-D	16	The Walk TV		
Grand Junction	KJCT-CD	8	ABC, The CW on 8.2, Ion Television on 8.3		
Grand Junction	K22JN-D	22	Movies!		
Grand Junction	KGJT-CD	27	MyNetworkTV, CBS on 27.2		
Grand Junction	K14QU-D	38	IBN Television		
Gunnison	K09TH-D	10	Outside TV		
Gunnison	K13AV-D	12	KBUT audio, Discovery on 13.2		
Gunnison	K04DH-D	4.2	MeTV		
Gunnison	K22JM-D	22	Outside TV		
Ismay Canyon	K04OO-D	4	[Blank]		
Ismay Canyon	K05JW-D	5	[Blank]		
Ismay Canyon	K10NY-D	10	[Blank]		
Ismay Canyon	K13XG-D	13	[Blank]		
Parlin	K03EY-D	2	Slient		
Pitkin	K21EF-D	2	[Blank]		
Steamboat Springs	K26GY-D	26	Slient	(Note: Licensed to Breckenridge, Colorado.)	
Steamboat Springs	K28HI-D	28	Slient		
Steamboat Springs	KHSB-LD	33	IBN Television		
Thomasville	K09YO-D	31	[Blank]		
Weber Canyon	K02OS-D	2	[Blank]		
Weber Canyon	K04ON-D	4	[Blank]		
Weber Canyon	K08MB-D	8	[Blank]		
Weber Canyon	K10OD-D	10	[Blank]		
Weber Canyon	K13XH-D	13	[Blank]		
~Blanding, UT	K15GU-D	15	[Blank]	(Note: Licensed to Dove Creek, Colorado.)	
~Blanding, UT	K19GB-D	19	[Blank]		
~Blanding, UT	K21GT-D	21	[Blank]		
~Blanding, UT	K23GF-D	23	[Blank]		
~Blanding, UT	K30DC-D	30	[Blank]		
~Blanding, UT	K31OE-D	31	[Blank]		

== Translators ==
Television station translators in Colorado
Media market	Station	Channel	Translating	Notes	Refs
Akron	K35FI-D	2; 6; 20	K16NJ-D		
Akron	K11UW-D	3; 7; 10	KCDO-TV		
Akron	K20NI-D	4	KCNC-TV		
Akron	K13XW-D	6	KRMA-TV		
Akron	K08ND-D	9	KUSA		
Akron	K33FI-D	9	KUSA		
Akron	K18MS-D	47	K21NZ-D		
Akron	K26OT-D	47	K21NZ-D		
Alamosa	K23NF-D	4	KOB	(Note: Licensed to Romeo, Colorado.)	
Alamosa	K17JW-D	7	KOAT-TV		
Alamosa	K32IK-D	8	KTSC	(Note: Licensed to San Luis Valley, Colorado.)	
Alamosa	K35OO-D	8	KTSC	(Note: Licensed to Del Norte, Colorado.)	
Alamosa	K35OQ-D	8	KTSC	(Note: Licensed to San Luis, Colorado.)	
Alamosa	K29ME-D	11	KCHF	(Note: Licensed to Antonito, Colorado.)	
Alamosa	K31IV-D	11	KKTV		
Alamosa	K19IX-D	15	KTEL-CD		
Alamosa	K27MT-D	28	KSPK-LD		
Anton	K29NF-D	2; 3; 6; 12; 20	KWGN-TV; KCDO-TV; KRMA; KBDI-TV; KTVD		
Anton	K16NJ-D	2; 6; 20	KWGN-TV; KRMA; KTVD		
Anton	K17KX-D	6	KRMA-TV		
Anton	K14NM-D	9	KUSA		
Anton	K15MH-D	31	KDVR		
Anton	K21NZ-D	47	KCNC-TV; KDVR; KMGH-TV; KUSA		
Aspen	K16FS-D	2	K22OI-D	(Note: Licensed to Woody Creek, Colorado.)	
Aspen	K26PG-D	4	KFQX		
Aspen	K33QL-D	4	KFQX		
Aspen	K35PE-D	5	KREX-TV		
Aspen	K46KI-D	7	K30JQ-D		
Aspen	K25MR-D	8	KJCT-LP		
Aspen	K32OK-D	9; 12.2	KUSA; KBDI-TV		
Aspen	K25QI-D	11	K29CK-D		
Aspen	K27OV-D	18	KRMJ		
Aspen	K26LH-D	18	KRMJ		
Aspen	K14OV-D	31	KDVR		
Basalt	K35IX-D	5	KREX-TV		
Basalt	K34KM-D	8	KJCT-LP		
Basalt	K15IF-D	9	KUSA		
Basalt	K17JA-D	11	KKCO		
Basalt	K36GX-D	18	KRMJ		
Basalt	K33HY-D	31	KDVR		
Carbondale	K22OI-D	2; 20	KWGN-TV; KTVD		
Carbondale	K30JQ-D	7; 59	KMGH-TV; KPXC-TV		
Carbondale	K28JY-D	8	KJCT-LP		
Carbondale	K24NZ-D	9; 12	KUSA; KBDI-TV		
Carbondale	K20OE-D	18	KRMJ	(Note: Licensed to Silt, Colorado.)	
Carbondale	K31CW-D	18	KRMJ		
Carbondale	K29CK-D	31	KDVR		
Cheyenne Wells	K16LF-D	5	KOAA-TV	(Note: Licensed to Eads, Colorado.)	
Cheyenne Wells	K34LN-D	5	KOAA-TV		
Cheyenne Wells	K19KN-D	8	KTSC		
Cheyenne Wells	K17MI-D	11	KKTV		
Cheyenne Wells	K36LB-D	11	KKTV		
Cheyenne Wells	K18LL-D	13	KRDO-TV		
Cheyenne Wells	K38MK-D	13	KRDO-TV		
Cheyenne Wells	K15KG-D	21	KXRM-TV		
Cheyenne Wells	K32MD-D	21	KXRM-TV		
Colorado Springs	K30JM-D	5	KOAA-TV	(Note: Licensed to Cañon City, Colorado.)	
Colorado Springs	K07PA-D	8	KTSC	(Note: Licensed to Manitou Springs, Colorado.)	
Colorado Springs	K29HM-D	8	KTSC	(Note: Licensed to Lake George, Colorado.)	
Colorado Springs	K31IX-D	8	KTSC	(Note: Licensed to Salida, Colorado.)	
Colorado Springs	K33IW-D	8	KTSC	(Note: Licensed to Coaldale, Colorado.)	
Colorado Springs	K35OM-D	8	KTSC	(Note: Licensed to La Veta, Colorado.)	
Colorado Springs	K35OR-D	8	KTSC	(Note: Licensed to Aguilar, Colorado.)	
Colorado Springs	K07BW-D	11	KKTV	(Note: Licensed to Westcliffe, Colorado.)	
Colorado Springs	K13ZI-D	11	KKTV		
Colorado Springs	K17OE-D	12	KBDI-TV		
Colorado Springs	K09DY-D	13	KRDO-TV		
Colorado Springs	K28KC-D	13	KRDO-TV		
Colorado Springs	K36JB-D	13	KRDO-TV		
Colorado Springs	K19MN-D	13	KRDO-TV		
Colorado Springs	K20JG-D	13	KRDO-TV		
Colorado Springs	WQLQ837	13	KRDO-TV	(Note: Licensed to Badger Mountain, Colorado.)	
Colorado Springs	K28GE-D	21	KXRM-TV	(Note: Licensed to Woodland Park, Colorado.)	
Colorado Springs	KSPK-LD	28	KSBK-LD		
Colorado Springs	K32OG-D	32	KKTV		
Colorado Springs	KJCS-LD	38	KDEO-LD		
Colorado Springs	K19LA-D	43	KSBK-LD	(Note: Licensed to Rocky Ford, Colorado.)	
Colorado Springs	K23OU-D	43	KSBK-LD		
Colorado Springs	KQAF-LD	43	KSBK-LD	(Note: Licensed to La Junta, Colorado.)	
Colorado Springs	K19LA-D	43	KSBK-LD		
Colorado Springs	KTNP-LD	46	KTLO-LD		
Cortez	K07UY-D	2; 33; 47	KASA-TV		
Cortez	K31CT-D	6	KREZ-TV		
Cortez	K35CH-D	8	KJCT-LP		
Cortez	K34PV-D	11	KBYU-TV		
Cortez	K20OG-D	12	KOBF		
Cortez	K36QB-D	12	KOBF		
Cortez	K16CT-D	16	KUPX-TV		
Cortez	K17JJ-D	17	KASA-TV; KOBF; KRQE; KOAT-TV		
Cortez	K22CU-D	22	KWGN-TV; KTVD; KPXC-TV; KRMA-TV; KBDI-TV		
Cortez	K24CH-D	24	KUSA; KMGH-TV; KCNC-TV; KDVR		
Cortez	K23LH-D	36	KSTU		
Cortez	K25QS-D	39	KUTV		
Cortez	K32IJ-D	42	KSL-TV		
Cortez	K33QG-D	44	KTVX		
Cortez	K15MJ-D	51	KUED		
Cortez	K27IG-D	52	KASA-TV		
Cortez	K11LP-D	54	KOBF		
Cortez	K29GO-D	56	KRQE		
Cortez	K09DM-D	57	KOAT-TV		
Crested Butte	K27OF-D	2; 9; 10; 20	K09TH-D		
Crested Butte	K34PU-D	2; 9; 10; 20	K09TH-D		
Crested Butte	K30EJ-D	2.2; 31	K13AV-D		
Crested Butte	K33KJ-D	2.2; 31	K13AV-D		
Crested Butte	K12AK-D	4; 7	K11AT-D		
Crested Butte	K31PH-D	4; 7	K11AT-D		
Crested Butte	K36LX-D	4.2	K04DH-D	(Note: Licensed to Wetmore, Colorado.)	
Crested Butte	K35LJ-D	4.2	K04DH-D		
Crested Butte	K32NT-D	8	K06HN-D		
Crested Butte	K29NG-D	8	K06HN-D		
Denver	KZCO-LD	3; 7	KCDO-TV; KMGH-TV		
Denver	K24HQ-D	6	KRMA-TV		
Denver	KZFC-LD	7	KMGH-TV	(Note: Licensed to Windsor, Colorado.)	
Denver	KSBS-CD	10	KCDO-TV		
Denver	K22NW-D	12	KBDI-TV		
Denver	KMLN-LD	24	KDEO-LD		
Denver	KQDK-LD	39	KQCK		
Denver	KDNF-LD	44	KRMT	(Note: Licensed to Arvada, Colorado.)	
Dolores	K02OG-D	17	K17JJ-D		
Durango	K19LD-D	2	KASA-TV	(Note: Licensed to Bayfield, Colorado.)	
Durango	KXZQ-LD	2	KASA-TV		
Durango	K31FV-D	6	KREZ-TV		
Durango	K34QD-D	6	KREZ-TV		
Durango	K13PJ-D	7	KOAT-TV	(Note: Licensed to Vallecito, Colorado.)	
Durango	K24NH-D	7	KOAT-TV		
Durango	K10AD-D	12	KOBF		
Durango	K21OG-D	12	KOBF		
Durango	K25GE-D	12	KOBF		
Durango	K36IH-D	20	KRMU	(Note: Licensed to Ignacio, Colorado.)	
Gateway	K23NX-D	8	KJCT-LP		
Gateway	K17NI-D	4	KFQX	(Note: Licensed to Mesa, Colorado.)	
Gateway	K10RB-D	5	KREX-TV		
Gateway	K09ZS-D	11	KKCO		
Gateway	K16MR-D	11	KKCO		
Gateway	K25PC-D	18	KRMJ		
Gateway	K19NE-D	19	KJCT-CD		
Glenwood Springs	K27PL-D	3	KREG-TV	(Note: Licensed to Rifle, Colorado.)	
Glenwood Springs	K06GW-D	18	KRMJ	(Note: Licensed to New Castle, Colorado.)	
Glenwood Springs	K32HL-D	18	KRMJ	(Note: Licensed to Rulison, Colorado.)	
Glenwood Springs	K28HA-D	18	KRMJ	(Note: Licensed to Grand Valley, Colorado.)	
Glenwood Springs	K32NO-D	18	KRMJ		
Grand Junction	K26MS-D	4	KFQX	(Note: Licensed to Collbran, Colorado.)	
Grand Junction	K24LQ-D	5	KREX-TV		
Grand Junction	K22LR-D	8	KJCT-LP		
Grand Junction	K13RD-D	11	KKCO		
Grand Junction	K11PS-D	18	KRMJ		
Grand Junction	K13ML-D	10	KFQX	(Note: Licensed to Hotchkiss, Colorado.)	
Grand Junction	K25FZ-D	11	KKCO		
Grand Junction	KLML-LD	20	KGBY		
Grand Junction	K31OH-D	8	KJCT-LP		
Grand Junction	K35NQ-D	11	KKCO		
Grand Junction	K33PB-D	18	KRMJ		
Gunnison	K09TH-D	2; 9; 20	KWGN-TV; KUSA; KTVD		
Gunnison	K02IK-D	2; 9; 45	K24NM-D	(Note: Licensed to Gateview, Colorado.)	
Gunnison	K13AV-D	2.2; 31	KWGN-TV; KDVR		
Gunnison	K11AT-D	4; 7	KCNC-TV; KMGH-TV		
Gunnison	K33KE-D	4.2	K04DH-D	(Note: Licensed to Sargents, Colorado.)	
Gunnison	K27LK-D	4; 7; 20; 31	K25PT-D		
Gunnison	K06HN-D	8	KRMA-TV; KBDI-TV		
Gunnison	K29IT-D	8	KTSC		
Haxtun	K31FZ-D	2	KWGN-TV		
Haxtun	K35GO-D	4	KCNC-TV		
Haxtun	K32NU-D	3.2; 7; 10; 20	K23OX-D		
Haxtun	K36PT-D	7	KMGH-TV		
Haxtun	K34PW-D	9	KUSA		
Haxtun	K33GM-D	31	KDVR		
Hesperus	K13XX-D	6	KREZ-TV		
Hesperus	K04PJ-D	12	KOBF		
Hesperus	K02QI-D	20	KRMU		
Holyoke	K16ET-D	2; 6; 20	K16NJ-D	(Note: Licensed to Pleasant Valley, Colorado.)	
Holyoke	K24FU-D	2; 6; 20	K16NJ-D		
Holyoke	K29GI-D	2; 6; 20	K16NJ-D		
Holyoke	K23OX-D	3.2; 7; 10; 20	KCDO-TV; KMGH-TV; KTVD		
Holyoke	K28IX-D	3.2; 7; 10; 20	K23OX-D		
Holyoke	K14KL-D	4	KCNC-TV		
Holyoke	K25GZ-D	4	KCNC-TV		
Holyoke	K15FD-D	6	KRMA-TV		
Holyoke	K18GM-D	9	KUSA		
Holyoke	K21FF-D	9	KUSA		
Holyoke	K19EG-D	12	KBDI-TV		
Holyoke	K17EU-D	31	KDVR		
Holyoke	K30GO-D	31	KDVR		
Holyoke	K20GK-D	47	K21NZ-D		
Holyoke	K26GX-D	47	K21NZ-D		
Holyoke	K27IH-D	47	K21NZ-D		
Idalia	K20HM-D	2; 6; 20	K16NJ-D		
Idalia	K18FO-D	3; 7; 10	KCDO-TV		
Idalia	K24EZ-D	3.2; 7; 10; 20	K23OX-D		
Idalia	K26FP-D	4	KCNC-TV		
Idalia	K22CQ-D	7	KMGH-TV		
Idalia	K14LB-D	9	KUSA		
Idalia	K29HD-D	31	KDVR		
Idalia	K16EK-D	47	K21NZ-D		
Ismay Canyon	K02OU-D	17	K17JJ-D		
Jacks Cabin	K24KR-D	2; 9; 10; 20	K09TH-D		
Jacks Cabin	K16DR-D	2.2; 31	K13AV-D		
Jacks Cabin	K18IQ-D	4; 7	K11AT-D		
Jacks Cabin	K14NF-D	4.2	K04DH-D		
Jacks Cabin	K20JW-D	8	K06HN-D		
Julesburg	K18KH-D	3.2; 7; 10; 20	K23OX-D		
Julesburg	K22KW-D	4	KCNC-TV		
Julesburg	K34PT-D	2	KWGN-TV		
Julesburg	K20KO-D	3	KCDO-TV		
Julesburg	K33PZ-D	6	KRMA-TV		
Julesburg	K36PS-D	7	KMGH-TV		
Julesburg	K35OK-D	47	K21NZ-D		
Lamar	K23KN-D	5	KOAA-TV	(Note: Licensed to Las Animas, Colorado.)	
Lamar	K33KV-D	5	KOAA-TV		
Lamar	K29JL-D	8	KTSC		
Lamar	K31NI-D	8	KTSC		
Lamar	K35JS-D	11	KKTV		
Lamar	K25LE-D	11	KKTV		
Lamar	K27KX-D	13	KRDO-TV		
Lamar	K34NM-D	13	KRDO-TV		
Lamar	K20MP-D	43	KSBK-LD		
Lamar	K35MZ-D	43	KSBK-LD		
Montrose	K21JK-D	8	KJCT-CD		
Montrose	K28AD-D	8	KJCT-LP		
Montrose	K03AY-D	10	KFQX	(Note: Licensed to Ridgway, Colorado.)	
Montrose	K06HZ-D	10	KFQX	(Note: Licensed to Paonia, Colorado.)	
Montrose	K23NW-D	11	KKCO		
Montrose	K31IW-D	18	KRMJ		
Montrose	K35NS-D	18	KRMJ		
Montrose	K09PJ-D	18	KRMJ	(Note: Licensed to Ouray, Colorado.)	
Montrose	K35ON-D	18	KRMJ		
Montrose	K24JO-D	18	KRMJ	(Note: Licensed to Crawford, Colorado.)	
Montrose	K13SN-D	18	KRMJ	(Note: Licensed to Nucla, Colorado.)	
Montrose	K32CW-D	18	KRMJ		
Parlin	K29IU-D	2; 9; 10; 20	K09TH-D		
Parlin	K36GQ-D	2.2; 31	K13AV-D		
Parlin	K27KA-D	4; 7	K11AT-D		
Parlin	K28PZ-D	4.2	K04DH-D		
Parlin	K30PY-D	8	K06HN-D		
Peetz	K18FN-D	2; 6; 20	K16NJ-D		
Peetz	K14JZ-D	3; 7; 10	KCDO-TV		
Peetz	K20FS-D	3; 7; 10	KCDO-TV		
Peetz	K32EX-D	4	KCNC-TV		
Peetz	K26FM-D	9	KUSA		
Peetz	K28FW-D	9	KUSA		
Peetz	K16EJ-D	47	K21NZ-D		
Peetz	K30FO-D	47	K21NZ-D		
Pitkin	K10MA-D	2; 9; 45	K24NM-D	(Note: Licensed to Waunita Hot Springs, Colorado.)	
Pitkin	K12AL-D	4; 7; 20; 31	K25PT-D		
Pitkin	K15ED-D	8	KTSC		
Pitkin	K23DX-D	8	KTSC		
Redstone	K21OV-D	5	KREX-TV		
Redstone	K32OL-D	8	KJCT-LP		
Redstone	K16NS-D	9	KUSA		
Redstone	K26IT-D	11	KKCO		
Redstone	K19HG-D	18	KRMJ		
Redstone	K18GD-D	31	KDVR		
Sapinero	K28QA-D	2; 9; 10; 20	K09TH-D		
Sapinero	K12LX-D	2; 9; 45	K24NM-D	(Note: Licensed to Powderhorn, Colorado.)	
Sapinero	K09WB-D	4; 7; 20; 31	K25PT-D		
Sapinero	K26OS-D	8	K06HN-D		
Sapinero	K07ZG-D	8	KTSC		
Sargents	K24NM-D	2; 9; 45	KWGN-TV; KUSA; KCDO-TV		
Sargents	K13ZS-D	2; 9; 45	K24NM-D		
Sargents	K25PT-D	4; 7; 20; 31	KCNC-TV; KMGH-TV; KTVD; KDVR		
Sargents	K02NV-D	4; 7; 20; 31	K25PT-D		
Sargents	K11TJ-D	8	K06HN-D		
Sargents	K34NL-D	8	K06HN-D		
Steamboat Springs	K08EM-LD	8	KCNC-TV; KRMA-TV; KMGH-TV; KUSA		
Steamboat Springs	K10PM-D	10	KBDI-TV; KTVD; KDEN-TV		
Steamboat Springs	K12EK-LD	22	KFCT		
Sterling	K19LW-D	2; 6; 20	K16NJ-D		
Sterling	K31IQ-D	2; 6; 20	K16NJ-D		
Sterling	K34OS-D	3; 7; 10	KCDO-TV	(Note: Licensed to Sterling and southern Logan County, Colorado.)	
Sterling	K17NH-D	4	KCNC-TV		
Sterling	K15LI-D	47	K21NZ-D		
Sterling	K33PA-D	47	K21NZ-D		
Sterling	K36OY-D	47	K21NZ-D		
Thomasville	K07KF-D	5	KREX-TV		
Thomasville	K10PR-D	8	KJCT-CD		
Thomasville	K11LM-D	11	KKCO		
Thomasville	K08OX-D	18	KRMJ		
Thomasville	K12QM-D	31	KDVR		
Trinidad	K19HC-D	5	KOAA-TV	(Note: Licensed to Hoehne, Colorado.)	
Trinidad	K15GL-D	8	KTSC		
Trinidad	K17IG-D	13	KRDO-TV		
Trinidad	K18JX-D	21	KXRM-TV		
Trinidad	K34GI-D	28	KSPK-LD		
Weber Canyon	K05LI-D	17	K17JJ-D		
Wray	K14SA-D	2; 6; 20	K16NJ-D		
Wray	K31IH-D	2; 6; 20	K16NJ-D		
Wray	K19ML-D	7	KMGH-TV		
Wray	K16NH-D	20	KTVD		
Wray	K15MD-D	31	KDVR		
Wray	K17OA-D	47	K21NZ-D		
Wray	K18NB-D	59	K14NM-D		
Yuma	K28JH-D	2; 6; 20	K16NJ-D		
Yuma	K34AC-D	3; 7; 10	KCDO-TV		
Yuma	K35OL-D	3; 7; 10	KCDO-TV		
Yuma	K32AB-D	4	KCNC-TV		
Yuma	K30HA-D	9	KUSA		
Yuma	K31PC-D	31	KDVR		
Yuma	K33PU-D	47	K21NZ-D		
Yuma	K36AC-D	47	K21NZ-D		

== Defunct ==
- KDZA-TV Pueblo (1953–1954)
- KJFL-TV Durango (1963–1964)
