= KUVO =

Jazz music public radio station in Denver

- Denver, Colorado; United States
- Broadcast area: Denver–Boulder
- Frequency: 89.3 MHz (HD Radio)
- Branding: KUVO (Note: Pronounced KOO-voh) Jazz

Programming
- Format: Jazz and public radio
- Subchannels: HD2: The Drop (Urban contemporary)
- Affiliations: NPR

Ownership
- Owner: Rocky Mountain Public Media Inc.
- Sister stations: Rocky Mountain PBS, KUNC, KJAC

History
- First air date: August 29, 1985
- Former call signs: KHUM (1979–1983, CP)

Technical information
- Licensing authority: FCC
- Facility ID: 16687
- Class: C1
- ERP: 22,500 watts
- HAAT: 278 meters (912 ft)
- Transmitter coordinates: 39°43′49″N 105°14′59″W
- Translator: HD2: 104.7 K284CI (Denver) (The Drop)
- Repeater: KVJZ (91.7 FM) Breckenridge

Links
- Public license information: Public file; LMS
- Webcast: Listen live
- Website: kuvo.org; HD2: thedrop1047.org

KUVO (89.3 FM) is a public radio station in Denver, Colorado, United States, airing a jazz music format. KUVO is owned by Rocky Mountain Public Media and broadcasts from the Buell Public Media Center on Arapahoe Street and a transmitter on Lookout Mountain. It is also broadcast on KVJZ (91.7 FM) in Breckenridge.

The construction permit for what became KUVO was obtained in 1979 by a group known as Granfalloon Denver–Educational Broadcasting, which after a years-long battle with the University of Colorado Boulder ultimately found itself without the fundraising or expertise to complete construction. In 1983, the permit was transferred to a new group headed by Florence Hernández-Ramos which conceived of a bilingual public radio station to meet the needs of metro Denver's Hispanic community. KUVO began broadcasting on August 29, 1985, with a format of Latin jazz and jazz fusion, presented primarily in English. It soon broadened its base to become Denver's mainstream jazz station, aided by the demise of commercial competitor KADX in 1988. KUVO operated from several facilities in its early years before relocating in 1994 to Denver's Five Points neighborhood. Despite becoming prominent in Denver's jazz scene, KUVO lost money and went through several managers in the late 2000s and early 2010s while expanding into the Vail area.

In 2013, KUVO merged into Rocky Mountain Public Media, which gave it stronger financial backing. In 2019, KUVO's second HD Radio subchannel was used to launch The Drop, an alternative urban contemporary station, which is broadcast over an FM translator of its own in metro Denver. The station broadcasts a lineup of hosted jazz music programs as well as specialty shows and, on Sundays, Spanish-language music.

== History ==
=== Construction and early years ===
On September 5, 1973, Granfalloon Denver–Educational Broadcasting applied to the Federal Communications Commission (FCC) for authority to build a new, non-commercial educational radio station on 89.3 MHz in Denver. Taking its name from the type of mutual association depicted in the Kurt Vonnegut novel Cat's Cradle, Granfalloon incorporated in January with the goal of building a public radio station for Denver, which the principals felt was primarily served by commercial operations. Jerry Greene had worked at KDNA in St. Louis. Granfalloon found itself waiting. In 1978, the FCC designated a comparative hearing for its application opposite one from the University of Colorado, Boulder (CU). CU had previously applied for the frequency, surrendered its permit, and then refiled after Granfalloon. However, in 1979, CU withdrew, enabling the FCC to grant the construction permit to Granfalloon. Granfalloon selected a call sign, KHUM, and rented space in the First Universalist Church. As late as 1981, fundraising was being pursued to get the new station on the air. However, owing to a lack of funding and broadcasting knowledge, as well as the costs of fighting CU for the frequency, the station never started. By the early 1980s, 89.3 was among Denver's last available FM frequencies.

Several Granfalloon principals and a number of new entrants—among them Florence Hernández-Ramos, a former lawyer—created Denver Educational Broadcasting Inc. (DEB) to replace Granfalloon as permittee in 1983. Some of them had become aware of the opportunity because of Hugo Morales, the founder of Radio Bilingüe. The new group, backed by Western Community Bilingual Radio, envisioned a bilingual public station and changed the call sign on the permit to KUVO. The call sign was a corruption of the Spanish phrase ¿Qué hubo?. DEB began fundraising in earnest to put KUVO into service, though some in the broadcasting scene believed that the proposed format was too narrow and that Denver's Hispanic community could not finance it itself. During the planning phase, the station operated from the law firm of Federico Peña, which had available office space because Federico was working as the mayor of Denver. On August 29, 1985, KUVO began broadcasting with a primarily English-language presentation and a format of Latin jazz and jazz fusion from studios on Wazee Street near the Auraria Campus. The third-floor warehouse was soundproofed by egg cartons donated by a local restaurant. The jazz format and language balance were selected after market research of the Hispanic community in Denver. In 1986, the station moved from Wazee Street to the former KBPI (105.9 FM) studios on Morrison Road.

KUVO was one of just three stations in Denver radio controlled by Hispanics by the late 1980s and part of a growing "Chicano Public Radio" movement to build bilingual and Hispanic-focused stations in public radio, with its traditionally White audience.

=== From fusion to mainstream jazz ===
Though Denver's commercial jazz station, KADX, dropped the format in 1988, its owners opted to donate the station's record library to the University of Denver instead of KUVO, whose overtures were not returned. With KADX out of the format and many White listeners moving to KUVO, the station shifted to a more traditional jazz format, raising its profile in the community with live remote broadcasts, and getting better service by record labels.

In 1991, KUVO moved in with Denver's alternative public TV station, KBDI-TV (channel 12), at a former bakery on Federal Boulevard. KBDI was moving into the building because it had been forced out of its own studio, while Metropolitan State University of Denver established an office and both broadcasters began offering training to Metro State's students. The station also raised funds by selling parking for Colorado Rockies games at Mile High Stadium, which was five blocks away.

KUVO and KBDI began exploring a relocation to a building in Denver's Five Points neighborhood in 1992. The building had been acquired by the Piton Foundation in 1983, but plans to turn it into a housing development never came to fruition. The Five Points Media Center project was also supported by Denver's major commercial TV stations. KUVO made the move to the new studios in 1994. The Five Points Media Center, which also housed Denver's public-access television system, was designed to encourage minority involvement in communications.

In addition to jazz music, KUVO offered some spoken programs. Ken Hamblin hosted his show on KUVO for two stints, the second ending in 1992 when the host felt his listeners' demand for more airtime was being ignored. It also aired Morning Edition and Marketplace. By 1993, the Latin music aired as an eight-hour specialty show on Sundays; with more Spanish-language stations on the air in metro Denver, it shifted the presentation to English-language for this block to cater to the English-speaking Chicano audience.

KUVO became one of the primary vehicles for the jazz scene in Denver, even as the availability of jazz programming from NPR waned with funding cuts in 2002. It was the first metro Denver station to broadcast an HD Radio signal, in 2004. In 2005 and 2006, KUVO was named major-market jazz station of the year by JazzWeek magazine.

=== Management turnover ===
Florence Hernández-Ramos departed the station after more than 20 years at the end of 2006, at a time when the station was starting to meet financial headwinds. KUVO was without a permanent general manager for more than a year until Gene Craven, a longtime public broadcasting manager, was named in November 2007. Craven, who came out of semi-retirement to lead KUVO, departed in 2009. Carlos Lando, who had been KUVO's program director since 1987, was named general manager in 2012.

=== Rocky Mountain PBS ownership ===
Amid the financial struggles, in 2012, Rocky Mountain PBS (RMPBS), Colorado's primary public TV broadcaster, began providing accounting and back-office services for KUVO. The station was still running annual deficits, and in KUVO and its 7,000 members, Rocky Mountain PBS saw the promise of reaching the minority audience that listened to the station. In 2013, Rocky Mountain PBS agreed to merge with KUVO, absorbing some of its debt, and the investigative news service i-News Network.

In 2020, KUVO moved from the Five Points Media Center to Rocky Mountain Public Media's new Buell Public Media Center at 2101 Arapahoe Street. The facility contains a studio for KUVO supported by a $1 million naming rights gift from Koelbel & Company. Shortly after, the station experienced a transition in management and on-air personalities. In 2022, four longtime hosts departed within six months under contentious circumstances. Lando departed as general manager, remaining an on-air host in mornings, that year.

== Programming ==
Most of KUVO's programming consists of blocks of hosted jazz music and jazz-adjacent specialty shows. On Sunday, the station airs Spanish-language specialty shows including Canción Mexicana, La Raza Rocks, and Salsa con Jazz.

== HD subchannels ==
=== The Drop ===
In 2018, the Corporation for Public Broadcasting awarded Rocky Mountain Public Media and two other broadcasters grants to develop a hip hop– and R&B-based format for public radio. The Drop launched on an HD Radio subchannel of KUVO in June 2019 and began broadcasting on an FM frequency on February 15, 2021, after RMPM spent $680,000 to acquire translator K284CI.

=== Open Media ===
In 2019, KUVO entered into an agreement with Open Media Foundation and Denhac to launch Denver Open Media, airing on KUVO's HD3 subchannel and on a translator at 92.9 FM. The Open Media Foundation had previously run the low-power FM radio station KOMF-LP. In 2025, Open Media Foundation ceased its own broadcasts and switched the translator to rebroadcasting KVCU (1190 AM), the student radio station of the University of Colorado Boulder. KVCU had in the past broadcast on other translators in metro Denver.

== Repeaters ==
In the early 2000s, KUVO had applied for a frequency in Vail, as had Colorado Public Radio (CPR), metro Denver's primary NPR news broadcaster, and the Memphis, Tennessee–based Broadcasting for the Challenged. While the FCC gave an opportunity for the parties to settle, the Tennessee group was uninterested, and a proposal to create a station mixing KUVO and CPR programs failed over a disagreement as to weekend programming. In 2007, KUVO received the construction permit for KVJZ (88.5 FM), which began broadcasting by November 2009. CPR acquired KVJZ in 2020, at which time the station (now KVQI) began rebroadcasting KVOQ.

In 2001, Summit Public Radio and TV, which provides rebroadcasting services to radio and TV stations to Summit County, began broadcasting KUVO on an FM translator. A new KVJZ (91.7 FM) began broadcasting on September 15, 2025, supplanting the translator.

== See also ==
- List of jazz radio stations in the United States
