= James Case =

James Case may refer to:

- James Herbert Case Jr. (1906–1965), American educator
- Jimmy Case (James Robert Case, born 1954), retired English football player
- Jim Case (James W. Case, 1927–2012), American television and film director and producer
