= WBQC-LD =

Television station in Cincinnati

- Cincinnati, Ohio; United States
- Channels: Digital: 28 (UHF); Virtual: 25
- Branding: Telemundo Cincinnati

Programming
- Affiliations: 25.1: Telemundo; for others, see § Subchannels

Ownership
- Owner: Gray Media; (Gray Television Licensee, LLC)
- Sister stations: WXIX-TV

History
- Founded: September 24, 1986
- First air date: September 29, 1990
- Former call signs: W25AI (1988–1995) (Note: The FCC's call sign records show the station having the "DW25AI" call sign between January and February 1989; FCC conventions indicate that such a D in the front indicates a deleted license.); WBQC-LP (1995–2001); WBQC-CA (2001–2010)
- Former channel numbers: Analog: 25 (UHF, 1988–2005), 38 (UHF, 2005–2009); Digital: 47 (UHF, 2007–2018), 20 (UHF, 2018–2019); Virtual: 20 (2018–2019)
- Former affiliations: Independent (1990–1995, 1998, 2006–2011); The WB (1995–1998); UPN (1998–2006); Pax TV (secondary, 1999–?); RTV (2011–2012); Cozi TV (2012–2023)
- Call sign meaning: "The WB, Queen City"

Technical information
- Licensing authority: FCC
- Facility ID: 168413
- Class: LD
- ERP: 15 kW
- HAAT: 255.4 m (838 ft)
- Transmitter coordinates: 39°7′30.4″N 84°29′56″W

Links
- Public license information: LMS
- Website: www.telemundocincinnati.com

WBQC-LD (channel 25) is a low-power television station in Cincinnati, Ohio, United States, affiliated with the Spanish-language network Telemundo. It is owned by Gray Media alongside Fox affiliate WXIX-TV (channel 19) and 24/7 weather channel WZCD-LD (channel 30). The three stations share studios at 19 Broadcast Plaza on Seventh Street in the Queensgate neighborhood just west of downtown Cincinnati; WBQC-LD's transmitter is located on Symmes Street in the Mount Auburn section of the city.

According to its website, WBQC was the first television station to be fully automated. It was also the first station in Cincinnati to perform "digital spot insertion" and to air Spanish-language commercials.

== History ==
The station was founded by Elliott Block, who had quit his job with the City of Cincinnati in 1989 to establish a video production and rental business. Block first signed on the air on September 29, 1990. Broadcasting on UHF channel 25, the station had the callsign W25AI but was branded on air as "TV 25". Its transmitter atop Dollar Bill's Saloon in Corryville could reach viewers within a 5-to-10-mile (8.0 to 16.1 km) radius. The station originally ran mostly old movies, long-discontinued television series, and informercials via the Star Television Network and music videos from Hit Video USA. Simultaneously, he began planning on a second low-power station, W35BA.

In 1993, W25AI increased its signal to 22,000 watts, expanding its viewing area to include the full Interstate 275 loop. The Cincinnati Enquirer began including W25AI in its daily television listings, so that viewers would no longer have to call the station for programming information. The following year, the Enquirer also added the station to its Sunday television magazine, TV WEEK.

=== WB affiliation ===
Needing an affiliate in Cincinnati, The WB signed an affiliation agreement with channel 25. On September 9, 1995, W25AI began showing WB programming, rebranding itself on air as "WB Channel 25". It also changed its call letters to WBQC-LP ("WB Queen City"), after the Federal Communications Commission granted low-power television stations permission to adopt conventional call letters earlier that year.

=== UPN affiliation ===
In July 1997, the Sinclair Broadcast Group signed an affiliation deal with The WB that resulted in a number of the company's UPN affiliates and independent stations switching to The WB. One of the stations included in the deal was WSTR-TV (channel 64). As a result, WBQC lost its network affiliation on November 17, 1997, ahead of WSTR joining The WB in January 1998. UPN struck an affiliation deal to air its programming on NBC affiliate WLWT (channel 5), which aired its weekly then-Monday-to-Wednesday six-hour schedule from 2 to 4 a.m. on early Saturday, Sunday and Monday mornings as a secondary affiliation. Meanwhile, as an independent station, WBQC carried NBC programming that WLWT chose not to pick up, including various sporting events, as well as series such as Profiler and Sunset Beach. After a few months of poor late night ratings on WLWT, and with the addition of Thursday and Friday hours on the horizon the next season that would likely see WLWT refuse lower-rated programming and the network's Thursday night film, UPN resumed discussions with WBQC to join the network. On September 26, 1998, WBQC's eighth anniversary, UPN agreed to affiliate with the station.

=== "Should-carry" ===
WBQC had been pushing for carriage on local cable and satellite providers for many years. In 2005, WBQC swapped channel allocations with America One-affiliated sister station WOTH-LP (channel 38). In 2001, WBQC became a Class A television station, with the call sign WBQC-CA, in hopes of receiving must-carry status on cable providers and protection from displacement by the full-power stations' digital channel allocations. As a Class A station, WBQC had to meet all the requirements of a full-power station. Ultimately, Class A stations did not receive must-carry status, though they did receive protection from displacement. In negotiating with the cable and satellite providers, WBQC claimed "should-carry" status, in the absence of federal must-carry recognition.

Several small satellite master antenna television (SMATV) systems and the Delhi Township cable system carried the small independent station. Meanwhile, talks with InterMedia Cable (Northern Kentucky), Time Warner Cable (Cincinnati), and Adelphia Cable (some suburbs) saw no progress for years. Shortly after WBQC became a UPN affiliate, however, a number of systems began offering WBQC on their lineups:

- DirecTV, Insight Communications (which purchased InterMedia), and Adelphia all added WBQC on channel 25.
- The city of Lebanon, Ohio, began competing with Time Warner with its own municipal cable service. Lebanon Cable, which has since been sold to Cincinnati Bell, carried WBQC on channel 17 (later channel 97).
- SusCom Cable (Indiana) added WBQC on channel 6.

Although Time Warner Cable had long included WBQC on its system in Oxford, Ohio, on channel 13, the station remained off of Time Warner's Cincinnati offerings. According to WBQC, some Cincinnati customers were told by Time Warner representatives that the station operated out of Indianapolis, Indiana; Dayton, Ohio; or "some guy's basement". At one point, Time Warner considered carrying WSBK-TV from Boston rather than WBQC (it had used the same strategy to keep Syracuse, New York UPN affiliate WAWA-LP off their systems until an ownership change, though that was more because of WAWA's low-quality schedule surrounding UPN programming).

Once UPN acquired Buffy the Vampire Slayer, Time Warner Cable resumed discussions with WBQC. After months of talks, Time Warner agreed to carry WBQC. Unlike the other cable systems, Time Warner Cincinnati would only air WBQC nightly from 6 to 11 p.m. on channel 20, a leased access cable channel. Time Warner later purchased Adelphia, but kept WBQC on the latter's lineup until after Time Warner Cable had fully transitioned Adelphia viewers into the Time Warner system.

From the late 1990s until at least 2001, WBQC aired a rebroadcast of WCPO-TV (channel 9)'s 6 p.m. newscast at 7 p.m. Later, WBQC formed a joint broadcast venture with Fox affiliate WXIX-TV (channel 19), allowing WBQC to air that station's 10 p.m. newscast during sporting events, such as Cincinnati Bearcats basketball. WBQC would also air some basketball games produced by WXIX.

On January 1, 2004, WBQC-CA moved from channel 25 to channel 38, switching places with WOTH-LP and rebranding as "UPN38". On channel 38, WBQC could broadcast a much stronger signal without interfering with stations in Lexington, Kentucky, and Miamisburg, Ohio.

=== Independence ===
With the shutdown of UPN and The WB in September 2006 and replacement by The CW (which was initially composed primarily of programs from both predecessor networks), there was a question where the network's affiliation would land in Cincinnati. WSTR was the WB affiliate and a full-power station; WBQC was the UPN affiliate, a low-power Class A station with full cable carriage (except for Time Warner Cable's Cincinnati system). On March 2, 2006, it was announced that WSTR would affiliate with MyNetworkTV. This seemingly opened the door for WBQC to potentially become The CW's Cincinnati affiliate; however, on April 19 it was confirmed that the network would be carried on digital subchannel 12.2 of Cincinnati's CBS affiliate WKRC-TV (channel 12). As a result of the shuffle, WBQC became an independent station upon the dissolution of UPN in September.

By July 4, 2006, in a stunt to promote its "Independence Day", UPN network programming was moved out of prime time, and was replaced with marathons, and then a schedule of older off-network dramas and comedies. UPN aired early Tuesday to Saturday mornings from 2 to 4 a.m. until its closure. The station then changed its logo, which had some elements of the Ohio state flag. The same year, WBQC moved from Golf Manor to its newly built studios in Roselawn.

With the launch of WKRC's "CinCW" digital subchannel, Time Warner Cable dropped WBQC on October 18 to carry WKRC-DT2 full-time on channel 20. The CinCW also replaced WBQC on channel 25 on both Insight Communications and DirecTV, which created some confusion to viewers who thought WBQC was the CinCW. Insight moved WBQC to digital cable channel 189. In 2007, Time Warner Cable Cincinnati experienced a change in management. Early the next year, WBQC and Time Warner Cable started discussions for cable carriage. However, Time Warner Cable stated it did not have any channels available, either on the analog or digital tier.

Logo as "WKRP-TV", used from 2008 to 2023.

On November 28, 2008, the station adopted the branding "WKRP-TV", drawing on the 1970s CBS sitcom WKRP in Cincinnati. According to Elliott Block, general manager and chief engineer for the small station, the move was made to promote the station's move to digital broadcasting. The change reflected only the branding of the station, as its legal callsign remained WBQC-LD.

In November 2010, Cincinnati Bell's local fiber-optic service, FiOptics, began carrying all five of WBQC's subchannels on channels 254 and 270 to 273. In January 2011, WBQC replaced its primary subchannel with programming from the Retro Television Network. In 2012, the station switched to Cozi TV.

=== Sale to Gray Television; switch to Telemundo ===
Block died on November 25, 2019. On September 28, 2022, Gray Television announced its intent to purchase WBQC-LD for $2.5 million. The sale was completed on November 21, making WBQC-LD a sister station to WXIX-TV.

On July 27, 2023, WBQC-LD became a Telemundo affiliate, with Cozi TV and This TV moving to separate subchannels, and getTV ending its run on the station to accommodate an upgrade of WBQC-LD1 to high definition broadcasting.

== Programming ==
WBQC currently airs Telemundo network programming. Until 2011, the station produced several local programs, including:

- New Xtreme Sounds – music entertainment
- Scizone with Bill Boshears – commentary on political and paranormal topics
- Friday Night Fu – campy kung fu movies hosted by Cap'n Dave and the Fu Crew
- After Midnight – music talent showcase
- On the Mark – call-in talk show hosted by Mark McDonald
- Sunday Mass

== Subchannels ==
The station's signal is multiplexed:

Subchannels of WBQC-LD
Subchannel	Res.	Short name	Programming
25.1	720p	WBQC-LD	Telemundo
25.2	480i	COZI	Cozi TV
25.3	480i	OUTLAW	Outlaw
25.4	480i	STARTTV	Start TV
25.5	480i	365BLK	365BLK
25.6	480i	CATCHY	Catchy Comedy
25.7	480i	DEFY	Defy
25.8	480i	QUEST	Quest
25.9	480i	SONLIFE	SonLife
