= Wick Rowland =

American television executive

Willard D. "Wick" Rowland is an American executive who is president and CEO emeritus of Colorado Public Television (KBDI/12), a PBS station in Denver, Colorado. He is professor emeritus and dean emeritus of the University of Colorado at Boulder.

== Early life and education ==
Rowland holds a BA in history from Stanford University, an MA in communication from the Annenberg School for Communication at the University of Pennsylvania, and a Ph.D. from the Institute for Communications Research at the University of Illinois at Urbana-Champaign. He was conferred as dean emeritus and professor emeritus by University of Colorado at Boulder and is a research scholar in the fields of public broadcasting in the US, mass communications and violence in the media. He attended the Catlin-Gabel school in Portland, Oregon and graduated from the St. Paul's School in Concord, New Hampshire.

Rowland was granted a Fulbright Specialist placement in the field of broadcasting, media policy development and communication/journalism education in Ethiopia.

Rowland served as a Peace Corps volunteer in Jamaica working in instructional broadcasting and adult literacy projects. “I wasn’t on the ground more than three weeks before I realized that I needed a much deeper education in media and development policy. The then ‘dominant paradigm’ didn’t explain much of what I was experiencing in the Jamaican bush. Coming to Annenberg gave me a chance to begin developing a whole new, more critical and culturally conscious approach to media history and policy issues, particularly with regard to public service questions."

=== Career ===
Rowland served as dean of the University of Colorado at Boulder School of Journalism and Mass Communication from 1987 to 1999. He was conferred as dean emeritus and professor emeritus status by the University of Colorado. In August 1999, he was named president of KBDI/12. Rowland was named "Television Person of the Year" by "The Denver Post" for 2010.

Rowland was the first vice-president of research during the early days of PBS. That is where he coined the phrase "closed-captioning" for the newly developed process for transmitting the written word on a television screen for the hearing impaired.

In Variety on January 22, 2011 he was quoted as saying, "You're spending a great deal of political capital on the Hill just to keep what you've got, instead of being able to look ahead to growing the pie. That's probably the most serious and misunderstood consequence of these periodic bouts that we have. I used to think that they were just periodic events of no significance, but now I think it's a way of keeping a lid on (us)."

In his writings, he suggests how the system could equip itself to develop a more coherent, visionary agenda for its own future and the nation’s media policies." Rowland testified before Congress in February 2009 about the Satellite Home Viewing Extension Reauthorization Act (SHVERA) on behalf of PBS.

== Published works ==
- Stewards for the Media Future: What Public Broadcasting Can Do to Plan for Its Own Future and For Federal Policies That Serve the Public Interest. Vol. Part Two. October 2010.
- "Adrift, Mute and Helpless: Why Everyone But Public Broadcasters is Making Federal Policy for Public Media" "Current": Part One, October 18, 2010
- The Illusion of Fulfillment (Association for Education in Journalism and Mass Communication, 1982)
- The Politics of TV Violence (Sage, 1983)
- Interpreting Television with Bruce Watkins (Sage, 1984)
- The Challenges to Public Service Broadcasting (Aspen Institute Berlin, 1986)
- "Shadows in the Corridors: A Capitol Hill Day dialogue" (article in Current, February 12, 2007)
- "Leadership in Times of Change: Media Education," (Lawrence Erlbaum 1999
- Palmeri, Hélène and Rowland, Willard. "Public television in a time of technological change and socioeconomic turmoil : the cases of France and the U.S. Part I. Looking back : the theory, the promise and the contradictions." International Journal of Communication, 2011.
- Palmeri, H. and Rowland, W. "Public television in a time of technological change and socioeconomic turmoil : the case of France and the U.S. Part II. New "reforms" and the prospects : looking ahead." International Journal of Communication, 2011.

== Awards ==
- 2006: Colorado Broadcast Citizen of the Year, Colorado Broadcasters Association
- 2009: Advocacy Award, Association of America's Public Television Stations
- 2010: Television Person of the Year, Denver Post
