= Emily Griffith Technical College =

Location
- 1860 Lincoln Street; Denver, Colorado 80203; United States; 39°44′45″N 104°59′09″W

Information
- School type: Public technical college
- Motto: For All Who Wish To Learn / Denver's most Unique Technical College.
- Opened: September 9, 1916 (109 years ago)
- Status: Open
- CEEB code: 7680
- Executive Director: Randy Johnson
- Education system: Denver Public Schools
- Colors: Blue and Green
- Website: www.emilygriffith.edu

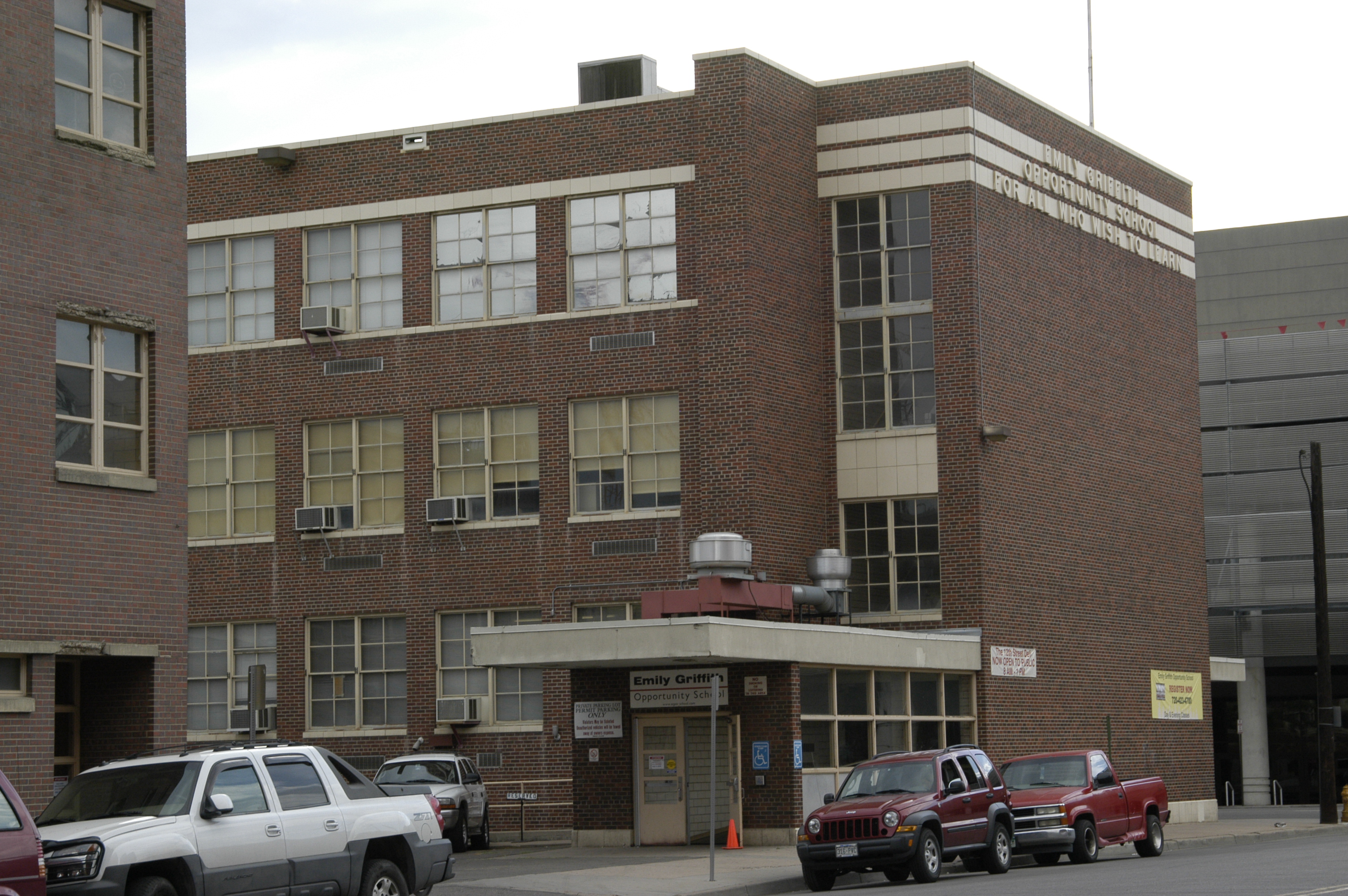
Emily Griffith Opportunity School former location

Emily Griffith Technical College is a public technical college in downtown Denver, Colorado, United States. Founded by Emily Griffith in 1916 as Opportunity School, it was renamed in her honor in 1933. The school is a part of Denver Public Schools, serving as the adult education arm of the district and is also associated with the Colorado Community College System.

The original building is designated a Denver Landmark under the name of Emily Griffith Opportunity School. It is now a hotel in the Hilton Tapestry collection called The Slate Denver.

== History ==
Denver educator Emily Griffith (1868–1947) shared her dream of opening a school to serve people of all ages and interests with a Denver Post features writer in 1915. Following its publication, she persuaded the Post and local trolley cars to promote the idea. In May 1916, Griffith received the condemned Longfellow School at 13th and Welton Streets from the Denver Board of Education. Opportunity School opened on September 9, 1916.

By 1954, the school served 10,000 students annually and had over 400,000 alumni. Public television in Denver, directed by Jim Case, signed on January 30, 1956, from a studio in an auto body shop at the school. Funding from Denver Public Schools gradually declined over the years, leading the school to begin charging Denver residents tuition in 1991.

Courses also changed with the needs of the community, adding more English as a second language and health care courses and closing programs in shoe repair, audio/visual electronics, and precision machining in the mid-1990s.

== Campus ==
The college operates across three campuses. The main campus, located at 1860 Lincoln Street in Denver, houses many of the school's Career Technical Education (CTE) programs, along with Adult Basic Education (ABE) classes for those seeking their GED, as well as the English Language Acquisition (ELA, also known as ESL) programs. A second campus at 1205 Osage Street houses the College of Trades and Industry, while a third campus at 2101 Arapahoe St. houses the Multimedia and Video Program.

== Organization ==
In 1990 the Emily Griffith Foundation, a 501(c)(3) nonprofit corporation, was founded to provide financial support for Emily Griffith Technical College. The foundation is governed by a board of directors. Board members are business and industry leaders, educators, and community representatives.

== Academics ==
Emily Griffith Technical College is organized into several areas of study: the Apprenticeships Training Division, the College of Health Sciences and Administration, the College of Trades, Industry, and Professional Studies, the College of Creative Arts and Design, the Adult Basic Education program, and the Language Learning Center. The Language Learning Center is the largest English Language Acquisition (ELA) program in Colorado and serves 3,000 students a year.

== Notes/references ==
- Brink, Carolyn. Class Acts: Stories from the Emily Griffith Opportunity School ISBN 0-86541-079-8
- Faulkner, Debra. Touching Tomorrow: The Emily Griffith Story ISBN 978-0-86541-078-7
- Lohse, Joyce. Emily Griffith: Opportunity's Teacher ISBN 0-86541-077-1
