= Channel 20 TV stations in Mexico =

The following television stations broadcast on digital channel 20 in Mexico:

- XHCHD-TDT in Ciudad Delicias, Chihuahua
- XHCHU-TDT in Ciudad Cuauhtémoc, Chihuahua
- XHCIP-TDT in Cuernavaca, Morelos
- XHCK-TDT in Chilpancingo, Guerrero
- XHCTCA-TDT in Campeche, Campeche
- XHCTJA-TDT in Xalapa, Veracruz
- XHCTVI-TDT in Ciudad Victoria, Tamaulipas
- XHCVP-TDT in Coatzacoalcos, Veracruz
- XHENT-TDT in Ensenada, Baja California
- XHGEM-TDT in Toluca, Mexico
- XHGST-TDT in Guaymas, Sonora
- XHILA-TDT in Mexicali, Baja California
- XHJBT-TDT in San Juan Bautista Tuxtepec, Oaxaca
- XHO-TDT in Torreón, Coahuila
- XHPBCN-TDT in Cancún, Quintana Roo
- XHPN-TDT in Piedras Negras, Coahuila
- XHSPA-TDT in Sahuaripa, Sonora
- XHSPRCE-TDT in Celaya, Guanajuato
- XHSPRGA-TDT in Guadalajara, Jalisco
- XHSTC-TDT in Saltillo, Coahuila
- XHTMCH-TDT in Chetumal, Quintana Roo
- XHTMNL-TDT in Agualeguas, Nuevo León
- XHTTG-TDT in the state of Chiapas
- XHZAC-TDT in Zacatecas, Zacatecas
- XHZAP-TDT in Zacatlán, Puebla
