= Jim Case =

American film producer

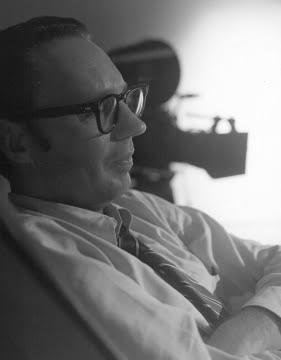
- Born: James W. Case; June 18, 1927
- Died: March 19, 2012 (aged 84)
- Education: University of Denver
- Occupations: Television and film director and producer
- Employer(s): KRMA-TV, NBC, CBS, KCET, Sam Lusky Associates, and KPBS
- Notable work: The Ragtime Era, Redman's America series, The Naturalists, The Glory Trail, and Artists in America: James Salter
- Spouse: Elizabeth Case
- Children: 1

James W. Case (June 18, 1927 – March 19, 2012) was a director and producer for American television and film. He worked for NBC, CBS and various other media organizations throughout his career. He is most notable for his involvement in The Ragtime Era, a 1959 television series which he directed during his time with KRMA-TV. Other educational works directed by Case include the Redman's America series, Our Neighbor: The Moon, The Naturalists, Artists in America: James Salter and many others.

== Early life and career beginnings ==
Jim Case was born in Kansas City, Missouri, on June 18, 1927. He served in the United States Army as a medic in Germany at the end of World War II. Afterwards, he attended the University of Kansas City (later University of Kansas City-Missouri), and graduated from the University of Denver in 1950 earning his Bachelor of Arts from what was then the Radio and Television Department of the university. During his time at the university, he met Noel Jordan who was a professor in his department and was a former NBC Executive. Upon graduation, Case was recommended by Jordan to NBC in New York City where he got an interview for a position as an NBC Page. Case obtained the position and learned the ropes of NBC in New York for 11 months and after this time was offered a staff job. Case worked in various capacities on several NBC shows including film producer for Howdy Doody and as a production assistant on Sid Caesar's Your Show of Shows, "All Star Review" and "Colgate Comedy Hour."

== Media career ==
After working in New York for four years, Case relocated to the west coast in 1954 and accepted a position as a budget control officer at CBS Television City located in Los Angeles, California. After six months he realized that budget control wasn't his calling, so he returned to Denver and pursued other opportunities. In 1955, Case returned to the University of Denver and taught a Television Production course in the Radio and Television Department. Through a mutual connection, he was made aware of a new production opportunity on the horizon in Denver and eventually became the director of the city's first educational television station, KRMA-TV (now known as Rocky Mountain PBS).

When KRMA-TV went on-air on January 30, 1956, few knew that the television station, which initially aired broadcasts from a one-room studio in an old auto body shop at Denver's Emily Griffith Opportunity School, would become a pioneer in educational programming. During his career at KRMA-TV, Case directed numerous educational programs including Redman’s America but struck gold with his 12-part television series, The Ragtime Era, in 1959. The show featured the pianist Max Morath from Cripple Creek, Colorado, who, through his music and narratives, provided a social history about the United States. The show was different for its time because it strayed from conventional educational shows that simply presented information and instead, combined entertainment with education, which was appealing to new audiences. By the fall of 1960, the show was being aired on the National Educational Television (NET) network, which consisted of more than 50 stations, and was the first show to come from KRMA-TV that gained national exposure. In the winter of 1960, the Sunday Denver Post quoted John F. White, the president of National Education Television and Radio Center as saying of Case: "In Case, one observes a rare bird who combines executive ability, creative talent, an educational philosophy and exceptional professional broadcasting experience and quality standards." By 1964, educational stations that had rerun the series numerous times made the show the most watched noncommercial series of the time. Many credit Case as being “largely responsible for KRMA’s initial thrust which has kept the Denver station in the forefront of public television,” through the direction of this popular series and its follow-up titled Turn of the Century.

In 1964, Case left KRMA-TV and returned to Los Angeles after he was appointed the first program director of the NET station, KCET. Among the programs he produced were 30-minute films on Piatigorsky, Jean Renoir and King Vidor. “Later he became associated with KPBS, San Diego, and produced dozens of documentaries for public TV.” In 1966, Case returned to Colorado and went to work for the commercial advertising agency, Sam Lusky Associates, as a staff producer. During his time with Lusky's firm, Case directed a short 30-minute film for First National Bank, Robbie and the White Bike, which was a dialogue free story about a boy who borrows his brother's bike to explore the city of Denver on a warm summer day. The film, set to an original score, was a source of much local and national recognition, including a Nike Award from the Art Directors Club of Denver.

On the heels of the success from Robbie and the White Bike, Jim Case formed his own production firm, Circle Films, in 1969. Case was poised to have great success with his next project; a documentary detailing the discovery and resurrection of Christopher Columbus' ship, the Santa Maria which Columbus sailed in his first voyage across the Atlantic Ocean in 1492. Eventually, the crew determined that the ship wasn't buried under a reef where it was initially thought to be resting and production came to a halt. Case went on to produce a film portrait of James Salter, an internationally known screenwriter, director, and novelist for the Artists in America television series which aired on KRMA-TV in 1971. After this project, Case created a four-part series, The Naturalists, about popular American naturalists John Burroughs, John Muir, Theodore Roosevelt and Henry David Thoreau. Directed by Case and aired on KRMA-TV in the spring of 1973, the films, which consist of a "blend of the four men's letters, prose and poetry," took Case and crew across the country to film in the habitats that inspired the four. The Naturalists became a popular series at the time and eventually was rerun as often as his popular 1959 series, The Ragtime Era.

== Later life and death ==
In his later life, Case resided in Colorado with his wife. Despite being over 80 years old, Case, an avid golfer, continued to write. He wrote a series of golf-related essays, and “children’s books with more enthusiasm than skill.” He died on March 19, 2012, of prostate cancer. His papers, films and other materials from his long career were archived at the University of Denver.
