= KTSC (TV) =

Television station in Pueblo, Colorado

- The Buell Communication Center (left) on the CSU Pueblo campus
- Pueblo–Colorado Springs, Colorado; United States
- City: Pueblo, Colorado
- Channels: Digital: 8 (VHF); Virtual: 8

Programming
- Network: Rocky Mountain PBS
- Affiliations: 8.1: PBS; for others, see Rocky Mountain PBS § Subchannels

Ownership
- Owner: Rocky Mountain Public Media, Inc.

History
- First air date: February 3, 1971
- Former channel numbers: Analog: 8 (VHF, 1971–2009)
- Call sign meaning: Television for Southern Colorado

Technical information
- Licensing authority: FCC
- Facility ID: 69170
- ERP: 22.4 kW
- HAAT: 1,207 m (3,960 ft)
- Transmitter coordinates: 38°44′43″N 104°51′41″W
- Translator(s): see Rocky Mountain PBS § Translators

Links
- Public license information: Public file; LMS
- Website: www.rmpbs.org

KTSC (channel 8) is a television station in Pueblo, Colorado, United States. Owned by Rocky Mountain Public Media, Inc., it is one of the four full-service transmitters of the Rocky Mountain PBS (RMPBS) state network, broadcasting from atop Cheyenne Mountain between Pueblo and Colorado Springs. Master control and internal operations are based at Rocky Mountain PBS' headquarters in the Buell Public Media Center in downtown Denver; some regional programming is produced at the Buell Communications Center on the campus of Colorado State University Pueblo. RMPBS also maintains a Regional Innovation Center in Colorado Springs on the campus of Colorado College.

Before being subsumed into Rocky Mountain PBS in 2000, KTSC was an independently operated public television station serving communities in southern Colorado, set up by what is now CSU Pueblo.

== History ==
On June 16, 1965, Southern Colorado State College applied with the Federal Communications Commission (FCC) to build a new noncommercial television station on Pueblo's reserved channel 8. However, the original proposal of a lower-power station that would primarily have covered the immediate Pueblo area—despite the cooperation of KOAA-TV, which donated a surplus tower and transmitter—was dashed by changes in federal regulations and in funding procedures that were key to construction. As a result, the application was amended to specify a transmitter site on Baculite Mesa—which KOAA agreed to share with the college—before being granted on June 26, 1969. This modification was key to increasing the service area of the proposed station.

KTSC debuted on February 3, 1971, four months after the college's other broadcast service, KTSC-FM (which began in October 1970). However, some viewers in Colorado Springs and Manitou Springs were inadequately serviced by the Baculite Mesa transmitter. As a result, in 1977, KTSC sought federal funds to build new translators to serve those communities, and channel 21 for Colorado Springs and channel 7 in Manitou Springs were activated the next year. In advance of the launch of full-power KXRM-TV on channel 21 in 1985, KTSC's Colorado Springs translator moved to channel 53 and relocated to Cheyenne Mountain in 1982, and the channel was changed again to 15 in 1990.

In 1984, architect Temple Hoyne Buell donated a former Safeway supermarket building in the Midtown Shopping Center to KTSC, which had operated from studios on the campus of what was then known as the University of Southern Colorado since its startup. The station also ordered new technical equipment, which was moved into the new facility over the course of 1985. However, by August 1985, unforeseen construction and technical challenges had led KTSC to scrap the Midtown Shopping Center project; Buell instead donated $700,000 to a capital campaign for a new on-campus home for channel 8, which was completed in 1986 and named the Buell Communications Center. The Buell Foundation, set up after Temple Buell's death, later made a $6 million gift to RMPBS which led to the naming of its Buell Public Media Center in Denver.

Colorado Springs, the largest city in KTSC's coverage area, was unusual in that it received translators of three different public TV stations. In addition to KTSC, it was served by two Denver-based PBS stations, KRMA and KBDI-TV. KRMA began broadcasting to Colorado Springs on a channel 63 translator in 1989. Around that time. KRMA began to seriously consider expanding its presence by acquiring KTSC. By 1995, with cuts proposed to public broadcasting, feasibility proposals on a combination of the three outlets were being drafted. Two years later, merger talks between KTSC and KRMA deepened. By then, KRMA owner Rocky Mountain Public Broadcasters had opened a satellite station for Grand Junction and western Colorado, KRMJ (channel 18). In 1998, the two agreed to merge, spurred by the potential for major capital expenditures required to convert to digital television. To appease concerns from southern Colorado viewers who feared KTSC would lose its local character, USC and Rocky Mountain Public Broadcasters crafted a one-year joint-operating agreement. While USC retained KTSC's license, most operations moved to Denver. In the second half of 1999, KTSC's schedule was gradually adjusted to match KRMA's. The outright sale of the station was completed in 2000, having been slowed by fallout from a scrapped 1992 proposal to switch technical facilities with KOAA-TV, which would have allowed the latter station to improve its facilities in a way it could not while remaining on channel 5.

Despite the conversion, KTSC continued to retain some programming oriented toward Southern Colorado that was produced from Pueblo. CSU Pueblo and RMPBS retain a formal affiliation agreement by which university students are trained in the Buell Communication Center and involved in the production of regional programming, which by 2012 amounted to about 300 hours a year. The quiz show Matchwits, featuring teams of high school students, continued with Rocky Mountain PBS—being expanded to statewide distribution in 2012—until coming to an end in 2018 as the network shifted its education focus to younger age groups.
