= Channel 20 TV stations in Canada =

The following television stations broadcast on digital or analog channel 20 in Canada:

- CBLT-DT in Toronto, Ontario
- CFVS-DT-1 in Rouyn-Noranda, Quebec
- CHBC-DT-2 in Vernon, British Columbia
- CHNM-DT in Vancouver, British Columbia
- CIHF-TV-5 in Wolfville, Nova Scotia
- CJMT-DT-1 in London, Ontario
- CJMT-DT-2 in Ottawa, Ontario
- CKMI-DT in Quebec City, Quebec
