= Ken Hamblin =

American radio host (born 1940)

- Born: Ken Loronzo Hamblin II; October 22, 1940 (age 85); New York City, New York, United States
- Occupations: Radio host; political commentator; television personality; author

Ken Loronzo Hamblin II (born October 22, 1940), the self-titled Black Avenger, is the former host of the Ken Hamblin Show, which was syndicated nationally on Entertainment Radio Networks. His show peaked in the 1990s, but he left the air, without warning, in July 2003 due to a contractual dispute with his syndicator, the American Views Radio Network. Hamblin, based in Denver, Colorado, is the author of the books Pick a Better Country: An Unassuming Colored Guy Speaks His Mind about America and Plain Talk and Common Sense from the Black Avenger.

== Early career ==
The child of immigrant parents from Barbados, Hamblin is a policeman's son. He served in the United States Army's 101st Airborne Division before becoming a photographer for the Detroit Free Press. In the late 1960s Hamblin was a producer and film cameraman with the public television channel in Detroit, WTVS, Channel 56. An event Hamblin captured exclusively was the release of poet John Sinclair from prison after serving time for marijuana possession. Hamblin began his radio career in the 1970s. Hamblin has said he was once sympathetic to the radical left, including the Black Panthers, and gave them favorable coverage. He eventually came to the opinion the left had failed to bring about the type of America it spoke of, and he began to move to the conservative side of the spectrum. Hamblin is a licensed fixed-wing pilot and a motorcycle owner. He is a father and grandfather.

== The Ken Hamblin Show ==
Hamblin had a long-running local talk program on powerful KOA radio in Denver, a clear-channel station heard across the western and central United States. Hamblin hosted the early evening shift, which he worked the evening of June 18, 1984, when Alan Berg, one of the station's biggest and most controversial hosts, was gunned down. He gained national attention when his show, then carried on another Denver radio station, was broadcast on C-SPAN during the early 1990s. He was heard on KNUS and KXKL radio in Denver, as well as across the nation. After his show was syndicated, he was heard across the United States on about 200 radio stations.

In 1999, Hamblin was named one of Colorado's Top 100 most influential media personalities.

Hamblin's show had several unique features: playing various versions of the "Star Spangled Banner" at the beginning of the show; playing "Taps" for fallen law enforcement officers; announcing the execution of convicts on death row, often with a clip from the movie Unforgiven, saying "It's a hell of a thing killin' a man; you take away all he's got, and all he's ever gonna have." The execution segment was notable for having "Another One Bites the Dust", sung by Queen. Hamblin frequently referred to liberals as "Egg-sucking dogs", and sometimes challenged listeners to call in to, "Name one major American city that improved morally, socially, and economically after the city elected a liberal black mayor ('You can't do it')". He has also been an outspoken critic of Louis Farrakan and the Nation of Islam, challenging those unhappy with the United States to "pick a better country" and go live there.

== Life after leaving public life ==
As of 2010, Hamblin was reported to be living in Douglas County, Colorado and now spends much of his time traveling with his wife Sue.

== See also ==
- Black conservatism in the United States
