= WOTH-CD =

Television station in Cincinnati (1994–2018)

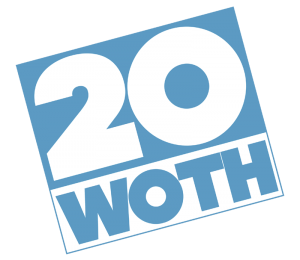
- Cincinnati, Ohio; United States
- Channels: Digital: 20 (UHF); Virtual: 20
- Branding: WOTH

Programming
- Affiliations: America's Store (1994–2006); UATV (2001–2006); Jewelry Television (2006–2009); America One (2009–2014); AMG TV (2009–2010); Retro TV; Cozi TV

Ownership
- Owner: Block Broadcasting; (Elliott B. Block)
- Sister stations: WBQC-LD

History
- Founded: September 28, 1990
- First air date: June 7, 1994
- Last air date: January 23, 2018; (23 years, 230 days)
- Former call signs: W35BA (1994–1998); W39CG (1998–2001); WOTH-LP (2001–August 2007); WBQC-LD (August 2007–April 2010); WOTH-LD (April 2010–February 2011); WBQC-LD (February 2011–July 2013); WOTH-CD (July 2013–January 23, 2018)
- Former channel number: Analog: 35 (UHF, 1994–1998), 39 (UHF, 1998–2001), 38 (UHF, 2001–2005 and 2009), 25 (UHF, 2005–2009)
- Call sign meaning: The Other Channel

Technical information
- Facility ID: 168414
- Class: CD
- ERP: 15 kW
- HAAT: 252 m (827 ft)
- Transmitter coordinates: 39°7′30.4″N 84°29′56″W

WOTH-CD (channel 20) was a low-power, Class A television station in Cincinnati, Ohio, United States. Owned by Elliott B. Block's Block Broadcasting, it was a sister station to WBQC-LD (channel 25). WOTH's transmitter was located along Symmes Street, just south of East McMillan Street in Cincinnati (shared with ABC affiliate WCPO-TV, channel 9).

== History ==
Former station logo

WOTH was previously branded as "The Other Channel". It began on June 7, 1994, as W35BA (channel 35), broadcasting programming from America's Store that had previously aired on WBQC. It soon moved to channel 39, becoming W39CG. In 2001, the station became WOTH-LP and moved to channel 38. WOTH adopted a simplified version of WBQC's old "25 TV" logo.

In the Federal Communications Commission (FCC)'s incentive auction, WOTH-CD sold its spectrum for $13,266,948; at the time, the station indicated that it would enter into a post-auction channel sharing agreement. On-screen messages later announced that WOTH would go off the air permanently on January 23, 2018.

=== Shutdown ===
WOTH went off the air permanently on January 23, 2018, at 5:03 p.m. The station posted a photo on Facebook depicting its transmitter being turned off. According to WOTH's Facebook page, WOTH would move some, but not all, of its subchannels to its sister station WBQC-LD (branded as WKRP-TV). Subchannels already moved at the time WOTH was shut down were HSN and Evine. Elliot Block, the station owner, stated that within two weeks of WOTH's closing, Decades, Movies! and Heroes & Icons would also be moved to WBQC-LD.

The station's license was cancelled by the FCC on February 19, 2018.

== Programming ==
WOTH aired network programming except for four hours per week of locally produced programs:

- Heart of Compassion
- Inform Cincinnati
