= KBDI-TV =

Television station in Broomfield, Colorado

- Broomfield–Denver, Colorado; United States
- City: Broomfield, Colorado
- Channels: Digital: 13 (VHF); Virtual: 12
- Branding: PBS12

Programming
- Affiliations: 12.1: PBS; for others, see § Subchannels

Ownership
- Owner: Colorado Public Television, Inc.

History
- Founded: 1977
- First air date: February 22, 1980
- Former channel numbers: Analog: 12 (VHF, 1980–2009)
- Call sign meaning: "Beady eye" (Note: Jeremy Lansman was known for jokes like this, and Broadcasting called the KBDI call sign "a typical Lansman joke".)

Technical information
- Licensing authority: FCC
- Facility ID: 22685
- ERP: 33.6 kW
- HAAT: 738 m (2,421 ft)
- Transmitter coordinates: 39°40′55″N 105°29′51″W
- Translator(s): see § Translators

Links
- Public license information: Public file; LMS
- Website: www.pbs12.org

KBDI-TV (channel 12), branded as PBS12, is a PBS member television station licensed to Broomfield, Colorado, United States, serving the Denver area. The station is owned by Colorado Public Television, Inc. KBDI-TV's studios are located at the Five Points Media Center near the corner of Welton and 29th Streets in the Five Points neighborhood northeast of downtown Denver; its main transmitter is located atop Mestaa'ėhehe Mountain (just west of Evergreen, in Clear Creek County), and it is rebroadcast by translators throughout the Front Range and eastern Colorado. KBDI-TV serves as Colorado's secondary public television station to Rocky Mountain PBS with an emphasis on local and independent programming.

Channel 12 was originally assigned to Boulder, where the University of Colorado investigated but never moved to build a station on it. In 1977, the Front Range Educational Media Corporation filed to build the station in the nearby city of Broomfield. While the Federal Communications Commission approved the application, a series of reports in The Denver Post revealed that John Schwartz, the primary backer of the applicant, had engaged in impermissible salary kickbacks when he ran a fledgling public radio station in Pittsburgh. Denver's existing public TV station, KRMA-TV, launched an ultimately unsuccessful legal battle to stop KBDI-TV from being built, calling into question Schwartz's character and competition for programming and fundraising dollars.

An FCC rule change on station construction allowed KBDI-TV to go on air on February 22, 1980. It was rushed to air with little programming, amateurish production values, and myriad technical issues, among them a transmitter site that impaired coverage of Boulder. Over the decade, the station gained its identity as a public television station willing to screen independent, alternative shows—sometimes from controversial points of view—in contrast to the more mainstream KRMA. Notable local programs of the 1980s included Homemovies, which featured independent filmmakers and home videos, and FM-TV (later Teletunes), a music video series that lasted through the late 1990s. In 1988, KBDI-TV moved its studios from a cramped warehouse in Broomfield to Denver, where they have remained at several sites ever since.

In the 1990s, KBDI's willingness to air programming by and for Colorado's gay community earned it a loyal viewer and donor base, as well as criticism. Over the course of the 2000s, the station rebranded as Colorado Public Television, adopting its present PBS12 moniker in 2020. Supported by more than 9,000 members as of 2022, KBDI produces a variety of local programming. Most prominent are the station's long-running weekly public affairs series, Colorado Inside Out, and election coverage including the production of candidate debates.

== Allocation to Boulder ==
Channel 12 was originally allocated to Boulder in 1952 as a non-commercial educational reserved channel. In the late 1950s and early 1960s, the University of Colorado (CU), located in Boulder, investigated building a station to use the channel. Even though it had no plans for it by 1959, the university opted to set aside money in order to file an application and thus keep the channel available for future use. That year, CU instead used 2 1/2 hours of airtime a week on KRMA-TV (channel 6). The university planned channel 12 as the second phase of an introduction of educational TV, to be preceded by closed-circuit operation on the campus.

As Colorado considered various plans for a statewide educational television system, channel 12 remained in the university's plans. The CU Board of Regents unveiled a plan in 1962 to construct a station on channel 12 by 1964–65; the proposed station would be connected with KRMA-TV and channel 8 in Pueblo. A 1964 proposal for statewide educational TV envisioned channel 12 as a joint venture of CU, Colorado State University in Fort Collins, and Colorado State College (now the University of Northern Colorado) in Greeley. However, it was never activated, in part because of interference concerns with research facilities in Boulder such as those at CU and the National Bureau of Standards.

== History ==
=== Construction and legal battle with KRMA ===
The Front Range Educational Media Corporation (FREMCO) applied to the Federal Communications Commission (FCC) on March 17, 1977, to build Boulder's channel 12 as a station in nearby Broomfield. (Note: A television station could be placed in any city within 15 miles (24 km) of the actual allocation, as Broomfield is to Boulder.) Broomfield was cited by Pat Burrows, the organization's treasurer, as a central site. The president of Front Range was John Schwartz, who had previously been general manager of WYEP-FM in Pittsburgh. The group proposed a heavy schedule of local programming, along with PBS shows; independently acquired programs; and what Schwartz called "experimental TV". On July 29, the FCC granted FREMCO a construction permit.

On August 28, 1977, Clark Secrest of The Denver Post published a front-page story calling into question Schwartz's job performance as general manager of WYEP-FM. It disclosed his involvement in salary kickbacks—the donation of the salary back to station operations—which were impermissible under Corporation for Public Broadcasting rules and revealed financial issues at the then-fledgling Pittsburgh radio outlet. Schwartz had no formal background in television. In the wake of The Post's reporting, Schwartz offered his resignation, which the board rejected.

KRMA-TV and its parent, Denver Public Schools—concerned about the emergence of a competitor for fundraising dollars and PBS programming—began to scrutinize the Front Range application only after it had been granted. In December, it formally lodged a complaint with the FCC, claiming that Schwartz had a penchant for "misrepresentation and deception" and "no ability to manage". Front Range defended Schwartz's actions as a good-faith attempt, born of youth and inexperience, to save WYEP. The FCC denied the KRMA petition in May 1978, and FREMCO began to lay the groundwork to start KBDI-TV, including voting to start construction on their transmitter site on Squaw Mountain. On advice of its lawyers, and in spite of a reconciliatory overture by FREMCO and arguments by Schwartz that two non-commercial stations could coexist in Denver just as they had in Salt Lake City, KRMA-TV appealed to the U.S. Court of Appeals for the District of Columbia. The school board criticized the FCC's handling of the matter as "crummy" and "inexcusably conducted".

The appeals court rendered its decision in January 1980. It vacated the permit grant and remanded the case to the FCC for hearings on FREMCO's financing and evidence as to Schwartz's character, saying the commission should have considered the impact KBDI-TV would have on KRMA-TV. Schwartz criticized the decision as being limiting to the arrival of second non-commercial stations into areas like Denver. Schwartz quit as president of the station, an action that in combination with a new financing plan was intended to relieve the issues at the heart of the matter; he returned in an advisory capacity two weeks later.

=== Launch and early years ===
The first year was bizarre. At station breaks, announcers would say, "Hey man, this is KBDI Broomfield." Microphones died. Reels of tape fell out of machines. Programs were inexplicably canceled. The Marx Brothers couldn't have done it any better.

— Robert Diddlebock, writing for The Boston Globe

A then-recent FCC rule change provided a legal pathway for KBDI-TV to immediately begin broadcasting, in spite of the court's ruling. The new rule allowed stations that had completed building their transmitter facility to go on the air without requesting further commission approvals. As a result, on February 22, 1980, KBDI-TV went on the air for the first time. It did so on a small budget; Front Range spent only $300,000 to build the station. Its original programming consisted of clips and previews of forthcoming features on the station. No studios were ready, so all the programs originated from the Squaw Mountain transmitter site. Clark Secrest, in The Denver Post, found the debut rushed, pocked with technical errors, and generally leaving a poor first impression; he highlighted the sign-on message from board chairman Jeremy Lansman, which stated in part, "Channel 6 didn't want to have us running", which he felt in poor form. He called the station identification crude, "scrawled with lipstick on a piece of cardboard". In retrospect, Schwartz admitted the station's first days on air were "unbearably sleazy". In the early 1980s, TV Guide estimated that KBDI only spent $3 per minute to stay on the air compared to $33 per minute for then-ABC affiliate KBTV.

The remaining litigation with KRMA was sorted out in the months after launch. In April, the FCC persuaded the appeals court to drop its request for a hearing on the KBDI matter.

Issues in programming and management slowly straightened themselves out. PBS programming began appearing on channel 12's air on April 15, and a satellite interconnection to PBS was activated in late September. In May, former PBS employee Tony Esposito was named general manager. During the first pledge drive, the station offered a mix of rare films and 1950s-vintage TV shows as its principal attractions.

Channel 12's modest early budget was reflected in its inadequate early facilities. The transmitter had been donated to the station by WTNH in New Haven, Connecticut, but the 1954-vintage part was at the end of its useful life. It malfunctioned in windy conditions, taking the station off the air. In one instance, channel 12 was dark for a full week in May 1981. A month later, a swarm of moths invaded the transmitter site and caused a short circuit, abruptly ending the evening's broadcasting in the middle of a movie. This was part of a larger invasion of moths in the Denver area. The roof leaked because holes had been cut in it for a cooling system that was not installed. Another problem was poor siting; intervening terrain prevented much of the immediate Boulder area from receiving a clear signal, as had been predicted before launch. It could not be seen at all in much of north Denver. Conversely, reception was often better on the outlying edges of the station's footprint in rural Kansas, Nebraska, and Wyoming, leading an early volunteer to joke, "We broadcast to more ears of corn and heads of cattle than any other station!" This was thanks to its transmitter site—the highest of any full-power station by elevation in the nation. To alleviate its reception issues in Boulder, in 1982, the station installed a translator on channel 11 to rebroadcast its signal from Williams Village. The studios likewise had issues; hurried refitting of a converted warehouse on 117th Street in Broomfield led to a city inspection that turned up "numerous" violations of electrical code. For years, the station was known for technical mishaps.

We're sort of the black sheep of public TV stations.

— John Schwartz

Schwartz returned to KBDI yet again in 1981 to head up local programming production. Shortly after, the station debuted Homemovies, a late-night show which showcased short movies produced by amateur filmmakers in Colorado. Schwartz led coverage of Denver's high-profile cable television franchise hearings later that year, winning plaudits from Secrest for his "steel-trap understanding" of the topic area and ability to ask hard-hitting questions of key players such as Reynelda Muse, a stakeholder in one firm seeking the franchise. Other local shows of the early 1980s included FM-TV, later renamed Teletunes, which showcased music videos; it was on the air until 1999. Off the Wall was an audience-interaction talk show. The station produced specials on nuclear disarmament and issues affecting the disabled community. Increased credibility made KBDI-TV a player in securing grant money to produce more local shows. In 1982, KRMA-TV's program director told The Boston Globe that the market had room for his station and KBDI-TV as long as they continued to be "divergent" in what they aired.

=== Move to Denver ===
As early as 1986, KBDI contemplated leaving the Broomfield warehouse, which it had outgrown, for studios in Boulder or Denver. Ruling out Boulder for technical reasons, the station selected Denver and announced its relocation to a site on Stout Street in 1988. To establish a studio-to-transmitter link with Squaw Mountain, the station built a 70-foot (21 m) tower atop the six-story building. The building was foreclosed on in 1990; the new owners opted to serve eviction notices on all tenants, including KBDI, which fretted about the impossibility of relocating its operation within a 30-day window. The station settled with the owners and vacated the premises in early 1991, relocating to a former bakery and construction school on Federal Boulevard. The 1992 documentary Tierra o Muerte, on early Mexican shepherds, won KBDI-TV a Alfred I. duPont–Columbia University Award in 1992. KBDI introduced Colorado Inside Out, a talk show originally hosted by Ken Hamblin, that December.

During this time period, KBDI burnished its image as the alternative PBS station to the more mainstream KRMA. A 1991 PBS decision cemented channel 12's status as a secondary outlet; it required stations that took less than half of PBS programming and therefore paid less to air PBS shows after the primary station in their market. In 1992, the station aired Lambda Report, a program on the gay and lesbian communities in Colorado that previously ran on public-access television; it was the first such program for the gay community to air on a public TV station. Highlighting a night of programming on gay issues in 1993, Dusty Saunders of the Rocky Mountain News called KBDI an "electronic halfway house" with a penchant for the controversial and asked, "Can you envision Channel 6 producing a local documentary on the gay and lesbian march in Washington in April?" He reckoned that the combination of these two stations provided a better public broadcasting service to Denver than many other markets received. The gay community became a key constituency of members and donors for KBDI-TV by 1994, in spite of the regular complaints the station received when it broadcast shows with gay themes; the next year, it was the first public TV station to air Network Q, a newsmagazine about gay and lesbian America.

KBDI and the other public media tenant of the building on Federal Boulevard, KUVO, began exploring a relocation to a building in Denver's Five Points neighborhood in 1992. The building had been acquired by the Piton Foundation in 1983, but plans to turn it into a housing development never came to fruition. The Five Points Media Center project was also supported by Denver's major commercial TV stations. KBDI-TV made the move to the new studios in June 1994. KBDI explored merging with KRMA and KTSC in southern Colorado, but talks broke down over the demand for a single board and CEO and the share of assets that KBDI would have in the combined venture. Though no merger took place, KRMA and KBDI did agree to share technical facilities; in 1998, they received one $360,000 federal grant to develop a joint master control facility, which operated until 2009, when the partnership dissolved amid conflicting needs related to digital telecasting.

=== Colorado Public Television and PBS12 ===
After 20 years with the station and 15 as general manager, Ted Krichels departed KBDI in 1999 to run WPSX-TV at Penn State. He was replaced by Wick Rowland, a professor at the University of Colorado and former dean of its School of Journalism and Mass Communications.

Rowland kept the station's proclivity toward independent and alternative programming, which some feared would depart with Krichels. KBDI continued to occasionally provoke controversy with pledge drive programming. In 2009, it aired America: Freedom to Fascism, a documentary claiming the United States was becoming a police state and tricking Americans into paying taxes, as well as two films espousing conspiracy theories around the September 11 attacks. Four years later, it screened Burzynski the Movie: Cancer Is Serious Business, on Houston's Burzynski Clinic; the PBS ombudsman took exception in a published column to the decision, noting the film "doesn't have the kind of critical other-side that one is used to in other documentaries".

KBDI began broadcasting a digital signal in 2003. Because it was not on Lookout Mountain, Denver's primary broadcasting tower site, it was not subject to the years of zoning battles that held up construction of a digital-ready tower there. It also was early to discontinue its analog service, doing so in January 2009 after winds up to 100 miles per hour (160 km/h) severed its transmission line and severely damaged its antenna. This was a month before stations were intended to switch to digital on February 17; the station instead prioritized repairing the antenna for its digital signal, which was moving from UHF channel 38 to VHF channel 13 as part of the transition, and exhorted viewers to switch to digital as soon as possible. In the years after the transition, the station increased cable coverage beyond the Front Range.

In 2005, Front Range Educational Media Corporation reincorporated as Colorado Public Television, Inc., and KBDI-TV rebranded fully under that name (CPT12 for short) in 2010. Rowland retired in 2013 and was replaced by Kimberly Johnson. Colorado Public Television rebranded as PBS12 in February 2020 to increase the prominence of the PBS brand in its own. Kristen Blessman succeeded Johnson after her 2021 retirement.

== Local programming ==
KBDI produces several public affairs programs, notably its weekly Colorado Inside Out and a documentary series, Decode Colorado. In 2023, the station aired Said Unsaid, a program on racial issues. Beginning in 2002, the station has produced Colorado Decides debates between candidates for public office. In 2004, KBDI joined with KCNC-TV and the Rocky Mountain News for the series. The series continues, now in co-partnership with KCNC and The Colorado Sun.

The local music show Sounds on 29th debuted in 2011 to spotlight Colorado artists. In 2020, it produced a season of new programs centered around music videos, including revisiting the archives of the station's former FM-TV/Teletunes series.

== Funding ==
For the year ended September 30, 2023, Colorado Public Television, Inc., received $8.23 million in support and revenue, of which $520,000 was contributed by the Corporation for Public Broadcasting, and had $6.6 million in expenses. The station had 9,085 members, and individual giving represented 60 percent of station revenues.

== Technical information ==
=== Subchannels ===
KBDI-TV's main transmitter is located on Mestaa'ėhehe Mountain, (Note: Renamed from Squaw Mountain in 2021.) west of Evergreen in Clear Creek County. Its signal is multiplexed:

Subchannels of KBDI-TV
Subchannel	Res.	Short name	Programming
12.1	1080i	KBDI-DT	PBS
12.2	480i	KBDI+	PBS 12 Plus (4 a.m.–4 p.m.); FNX (4 p.m.–4 a.m.)
12.3	480i	KBDI-DW	Deutsche Welle (4:3)
12.4	480i	NHK	NHK World

== Translators ==
KBDI-TV's signal is rebroadcast over the following translators:

- Akron: K35FI-D
- Anton: K15MH-D
- Boulder: K22NW-D
- Colorado Springs: KSPK-LD 11 and K17OE-D (12.1 and 12.2) (Note: Owned by Mainstreet Broadcasting Company, which received the K17OE-D facility in exchange for continued broadcast of KBDI 12.1 and 12.2 on the facility and five-year subchannel leases on five Mainstreet-owned LPTVs: KSPK-LD 11 Colorado Springs, KSBK-LD 28 Walsenburg, K34GI-D Trinidad, K24IY-D Raton, New Mexico; and K27MT-D Romeo, Colorado.)
- Cortez: K30HJ-D
- Haxtun: K32NU-D
- Holyoke: K27IH-D
- Idalia: K29HD-D
- Julesburg: K33PZ-D
- Peetz: K32EX-D
- Romeo: K27MT-D (12.1 and 12.2)
- Sterling: K31IQ-D
- Trinidad: K34GI-D (12.1 and 12.2)
- Walsenburg: KSBK-LD (12.1 and 12.2)
- Wray: K31IH-D
- Yuma: K28JH-D
- Raton, New Mexico: K24IY-D (12.1 and 12.2)
