= KRMT =

Television station in Denver

- Denver, Colorado; United States
- Channels: Digital: 20 (UHF), shared with KDNF-LD; Virtual: 41

Programming
- Affiliations: Daystar

Ownership
- Owner: Word of God Fellowship, Inc.

History
- First air date: August 21, 1988
- Former call signs: KWBI-TV (1988–1994)
- Former channel numbers: Analog: 41 (UHF, 1988–2009); Digital: 40 (UHF, 2007–2018)
- Former affiliations: Religious Independent (1988–1997)
- Call sign meaning: Rocky Mountain Television

Technical information
- Licensing authority: FCC
- Facility ID: 20476
- ERP: 84 kW
- HAAT: 344 m (1,129 ft)
- Transmitter coordinates: 39°35′58.9″N 105°12′36.9″W
- Translator(s): KDNF-LD (UHF 20, Arvada)

Links
- Public license information: Public file; LMS
- Website: www.daystar.com

KRMT (channel 41) is a religious television station in Denver, Colorado, United States. It is owned by the Daystar Television Network through its Community Television Educators subsidiary. KRMT's offices are located on West 64th Avenue in Arvada, and its transmitter is located on Mount Lindo in rural southwestern Jefferson County.

== History ==
The station first signed on the air on August 21, 1988, as KWBI-TV. Founded by Colorado Christian College (renamed Colorado Christian University the next year), it originally operated as a religious independent station using programming from FamilyNet and the Christian Television Network, with some family-friendly secular programs. In 1993, Colorado Christian University sold the station to Faith Bible Chapel International, a church based in Arvada; the station changed its call sign to KRMT on January 10, 1994. Faith Bible Chapel sold KRMT to Daystar in 1997.

== Technical information ==
=== Subchannel ===
Subchannel of KRMT
Channel	Res.	Short name	Programming
41.1	1080i	KRMT-DT	Daystar

=== Analog-to-digital conversion ===
KRMT shut down its analog signal, over UHF channel 41, on June 12, 2009, the official date on which full-power television stations in the United States transitioned from analog to digital broadcasts under federal mandate. The station's digital signal remained on its pre-transition UHF channel 40, using virtual channel 41.
