= KOBF =

Television station in Farmington, New Mexico

Satellite of KOB, Albuquerque, New Mexico
- Farmington, New Mexico; Durango, Colorado; United States
- City: Farmington, New Mexico
- Channels: Digital: 12 (VHF); Virtual: 12
- Branding: KOBF 12

Programming
- Affiliations: 12.1: NBC; for others, see § Subchannels

Ownership
- Owner: Hubbard Broadcasting; (KOB-TV, LLC)

History
- First air date: October 20, 1972
- Former call signs: KIVA-TV (1972–1983)
- Former channel numbers: Analog: 12 (VHF, 1953–2009); Digital: 17 (UHF, until 2009)
- Call sign meaning: "KOB Farmington"

Technical information
- Licensing authority: FCC
- Facility ID: 35321
- ERP: 30 kW
- HAAT: 125 m (410 ft)
- Transmitter coordinates: 36°41′43″N 108°13′16″W
- Translator(s): see § Translators

Links
- Public license information: Public file; LMS
- Website: www.kob.com

KOBF (channel 12) is a television station licensed to Farmington, New Mexico, United States, affiliated with NBC. It is a satellite of Albuquerque-based KOB (channel 4) which is owned by Hubbard Broadcasting. KOBF's transmitter is located south of Farmington on NM 371.

KOBR (channel 8) in Roswell also serves as a satellite of KOB. These satellite operations provide additional news bureaus for KOB and sell advertising time to local sponsors.

KOBF has repeated KOB since 1983, when Hubbard acquired it from the last of several owners of KIVA-TV, a small local station that was also an NBC affiliate.

== History ==
=== KIVA-TV ===
The Federal Communications Commission (FCC) allocated channel 12 to Farmington in 1957 at the request of Farmington Broadcasting Company, a corporation affiliated with the local cable firm which proposed to build a station that would attempt to seek affiliation with all three major networks. This application was then merged with another from Farmington radio station KVBC.

No station ever materialized, and it was not until 1970 that another bid on the channel was made, this time by Woodland Broadcasting, which owned radio station KUBC in Montrose, Colorado. By this time, channel 12 was used by KOB-TV translator K12GK, which was located on Caviness Mountain near Mancos, Colorado. Woodland's application for a construction permit was granted by the FCC on October 27, 1971.

Before the station was built, Woodland transferred the construction permit to Four States Television, Inc. The transmitter tower was built on the bluffs south of town, and KIVA-TV, an NBC affiliate, began broadcasting on the afternoon of October 20, 1972. It received network programs from KOA-TV, then the NBC affiliate in Denver, because KOB-TV did not grant permission for the new station to use its NBC feed. Originally broadcasting with 38,000 watts, KIVA-TV was approved to increase to an effective radiated power of 230,000 watts in 1974. That same year, sale of a minority interest in channel 12 to Allen Theatres and sales manager Marty Ball was announced; this fell through the next year, forcing general manager Jerry Proctor to postpone his plans to move to Houston and build a cable system there.

A group of five Houston investors led by John Catsis acquired KIVA-TV in 1976 and closed on the deal in January 1977; they promised to add a local news department to the station with two full-time reporters. In addition, they pledged to tackle "picture reliability" and network feed issues that plagued KIVA-TV's telecast of network programming.

The Catsis group sold KIVA-TV in 1981 to Center Group Broadcasting, whose primary shareholder was Alfred Burke and which also counted Stephen Adams among its stockholders, for $1.2 million and the assumption of up to $700,000 in debt. Center Group had its own plans for expanding the studio facilities and the news staff. However, it had to deal with a balky and "very old" transmitter that was prone to failing and taking the station out for days at a time. One of the failures was late in the fourth quarter of a football game; with the game tied, the station's electronic equipment switched automatically to another game, resulting in angry phone calls and even a bomb threat. (Note: One source claims this was the Super Bowl, though no Super Bowl matches the description.) Dale Palmer, who owned part of Center Group and was the second general manager under the company's ownership, noted that, while the company specialized in turning around broadcast properties, it had received "bad advice" about KIVA-TV, noting, "Essentially, all we got was a license and a building".

=== KOBF ===
In April 1983, an unexpected offer turned around KIVA-TV's hard luck. It came from KOB-TV, which was anxious to improve its circulation statewide and challenge KOAT-TV for first place in the New Mexico television news ratings. At the time, there were three NBC affiliates in New Mexico: KSWS-TV in Roswell, KIVA-TV, and KOB-TV; the former two stations prevented KOB-TV from broadcasting into southeastern and northwestern New Mexico. Hubbard Broadcasting reached a deal to buy the Roswell station and then offered $3.6 million for KIVA-TV, which Adams accepted within eight minutes.

Hubbard, like other buyers before it, was buying a fixer-upper, a station that had "[n]ever made a nickel" in its history. It promised to infuse as much money as needed to turn the station around technically and in its local productions; ground was broken in November 1983 on a new studio facility at Lake and Broadway streets. Bettie Sue Cleveland, appointed general manager by Hubbard, became the first woman to hold that post at a New Mexico television station; she died in 1990.

Local news at the conversion to satellite operation in 1983 consisted of one-minute news updates in prime time and cut-ins during The Today Show. KOBF debuted an expanded news service in 1989, which included news inserts into KOB's newscasts that covered the Four Corners region. By 1996, KOBF aired a 16-minute insert into KOB's 6 p.m. newscast and a 22-minute insert into its 10 p.m. program. Young reporters often learned the ropes of the television news business in Farmington, setting up, shooting and reporting their own stories.

On March 1, 2007, most of the extra news and all of the extra sports content was ended for viewers of KOBF. KOB management fired three of the four members of the news department, retaining one reporter/photographer. The decision was made due to stagnating national advertising revenue in the New Mexico television market.

== Technical information ==
=== Subchannels ===
The station's signal is multiplexed:

Subchannels of KOBF
Subchannel	Res.	Short name	Programming
12.1	1080i	KOBF-DT	NBC
12.2	480i	KOBFDT2	Heroes & Icons
12.3	480i	KOBFDT3	MeTV
12.4	480i	KOBFDT4	Catchy Comedy
12.5	480i	KOBFDT5	Ion Plus
12.6	480i	KOBFDT6	Ion Television
12.7	480i	KOBFDT7	Start TV

=== Analog-to-digital conversion ===
KOBF ended regular programming on its analog signal, over VHF channel 12, on June 12, 2009, the official date on which full-power television stations in the United States transitioned from analog to digital broadcasts under federal mandate. The station's digital signal relocated from its pre-transition UHF channel 17 to VHF channel 12.

=== Translators ===
- K21OG-D Bayfield, CO
- K11LP-D Cortez, CO
- K20OG-D Cortez, CO
- K36QB-D Cortez, CO
- K28GT-D Crownpoint
- K30EK-D Dulce–Lumberton
- K25GE-D Durango, CO
- K36PV-D Gallup
- K04PJ-D Hesperus, CO
- K20GT-D Indian Village
- K27OR-D Klagetoh, AZ
- K21OD-D Many Farms, AZ
- K36PY-D Pagosa Springs, CO
- K34PK-D Tohatchi
- K10AD-D Vallecito, CO
- K16DL-D Zuni Pueblo
