= Rocky Mountain PBS =

PBS member network in Colorado

- The network's headquarters at the Buell Public Media Center in Denver
- Type: Non-commercial educational broadcast television network
- Branding: Rocky Mountain PBS
- Country: United States
- First air date: January 20, 1956
- Broadcast area: statewide Colorado
- Owner: Rocky Mountain Public Media, Inc.
- Digital channel: see § Stations
- Sister stations: KUVO
- Affiliations: .1: PBS; for others, see § Subchannels
- Former affiliations: NET (1956–1970)
- Official website: www.rmpbs.org

Rocky Mountain PBS (RMPBS) is a network of PBS member television stations serving the U.S. state of Colorado. Headquartered in Denver, it is operated by Rocky Mountain Public Media, Inc., a non-profit organization which holds the licenses for most of the PBS member stations licensed in the state, with the exception of KBDI-TV (channel 12) in Broomfield, which serves as the Denver market's secondary (or "beta") PBS station through the network's Program Differentiation Plan. The network comprises four full-power stations—flagship station KRMA-TV (channel 6) in Denver and satellites KTSC (channel 8) in Pueblo (also serving Colorado Springs), KRMJ (channel 18) in Grand Junction and KRMU (channel 20) in Durango. The broadcast signals of the four full-power stations and 60 translators cover almost all of the state, as well as parts of Wyoming, Montana, Nebraska and New Mexico.

The network's offices and network operations center are located at the Buell Public Media Center on Arapahoe Street in Denver's Five Points section. KRMJ and KTSC maintain their own respective studio facilities: KRMJ is based at the Kephart Fine Arts Building on the campus of Colorado Mesa University on Bunting Avenue in Grand Junction, while KTSC operates from the Buell Communications Center on the campus of Colorado State University–Pueblo on Bonforte Boulevard in downtown Pueblo. Rocky Mountain Public Media also operates a public radio station, NPR and jazz outlet KUVO (89.3 FM) in Denver, which joined the organization in a merger announced in January 2013.

== History ==
The network's flagship station, KRMA-TV (channel 6) in Denver, first signed on the air on January 30, 1956, as an educational television station owned by the Denver Public Schools, with University of Denver instructor Jim Case serving as its program director. It is the oldest public television station in the Rocky Mountains. Its original studio facility was located in a converted body shop at the Emily Griffith Opportunity School in downtown Denver. The station was originally a member of National Educational Television (NET), before becoming a member of PBS when it launched on October 6, 1970.

Originally broadcasting only two hours of programming a day during the week, KRMA soon became a key PBS member, distributing PBS programming to many areas in the Rocky Mountain region that did not have educational stations of their own. From the 1960s onward, it began building translators across Colorado and surrounding states. It was also carried by nearly every cable television system in Colorado and eastern Wyoming. Denver Public Schools sold KRMA to the community group Channel Six, Inc. in 1987. In 1992, KRMA moved its operations into a studio facility on Bannock Street in Denver's Civic Center neighborhood, which formerly housed the operations of ABC affiliate KUSA-TV (channel 9, now an NBC affiliate); that station moved to a new facility located on Speer Boulevard before KRMA moved into the Bannock Street facility.

In response to requests from viewers on the Western Slope, KRMA applied for and was awarded a construction permit by the Federal Communications Commission (FCC) to operate a station on UHF channel 18 in Grand Junction in August 1995. That station signed on the air on January 1, 1997, as KRMJ. Prior to that station's launch, KRMA had been available on cable in western Colorado for decades. It still operates a number of translators in the area. Soon afterward, KRMA dropped its longtime "Six" branding and relaunched as "Rocky Mountain PBS" (RMPBS), while Channel Six, Inc. changed its name to the Rocky Mountain Public Broadcasting Network.

In 2000, KTSC (channel 8) in Pueblo joined the network after it was sold by the University of Southern Colorado (now CSU-Pueblo). The station had originally operated as a separate PBS station for Pueblo, Colorado Springs and southern Colorado from its sign-on on February 3, 1971. Until KRMJ's sign-on, KRMA and KTSC had been the only full PBS members in Colorado (as mentioned above, Denver's KBDI is a "beta" PBS member).

On December 3, 2004, KRMU (channel 20) in Durango signed on to serve southwestern Colorado and a small portion of northwestern New Mexico. When KRMU received its license in 2001, it was the first television station in the United States to operate a digital signal without a companion analog channel assignment.

On February 2, 2007, Rocky Mountain PBS added its fifth full-service station and its second station in western Colorado, KMAS-TV (channel 24) in Steamboat Springs. KMAS had served as the Telemundo station for the Denver market prior to joining RMPBS, and brought its programming into Denver itself by way of two low-powered repeater stations—KMAS-LP (channel 33) and KSBS-LP (channel 10). However, its status was placed in doubt when NBC Universal purchased KDEN-TV (channel 25) and converted it into a Telemundo owned-and-operated station. NBC Universal finally decided to donate the KMAS-TV license and transmitter to Rocky Mountain PBS. On September 4, 2007, the station's call letters were changed to KRMZ, reflecting its identity as a Rocky Mountain PBS station.

On January 16, 2013, it was announced that the non-profit investigative journalism organization I-News Network and public radio station KUVO (89.3 FM) had reached an agreement to merge with Rocky Mountain PBS. The merger was intended to broaden the reach of their content to new platforms and ensure formal collaboration between the outlets. The deal was expected to close in April 2013. With the merger, the corporate name was modified to Rocky Mountain Public Media.

In 2020, RMPBS moved out of the Bannock Street facility and into the new Buell Studios building which also house radio stations KUVO and Urban Alternative formatted The Drop.

In January 2026, Rocky Mountain Public Media filed to sell KRMZ for $200,000 to Atlanta-based Syncom Media Group, which owns four low-power TV stations in Denver. The FCC granted the assignment on March 9, 2026, reducing the network to four full-power stations.

== Programming ==
Rocky Mountain PBS produces several local programs, such as the weekly Colorado State of Mind, Arts District and the seasonal Colorado Experience. However, the network has focused much of its production efforts on local documentaries, which often take months or years to produce. Many of these documentaries (such as La Raza de Colorado, Jewel of the Rockies, The Arkansas River: From Leadville to Lamar and Urban Rez have earned multiple Emmy Awards over the years.

Satellite stations KRMJ and KTSC occasionally break away from the KRMA feed to provide programming targeted for their respective communities, and each station airs separate local promotions and underwriting. KRMU is a full-time satellite of KRMJ. KRMZ was a full-time satellite of KRMA until its sale in 2026. Citing costs at each station, Rocky Mountain PBS applied for and received waivers of the FCC's main studio rule, which requires that each full-service station maintain a main studio within its local service area.

== Stations ==
Station	City of license (Other cities served)	Channels VC / RF	First air date	Call letters' meaning	Former affiliations	ERP	HAAT	Facility ID	Transmitter coordinates	Public license information
KRMA-TV	Denver	6; 33 (UHF)	January 30, 1956	Knowledge for the Rocky Mountain Area	NET (1956–1970)	115 kW	331 m (1,086 ft)	14040	39°40′17.4″N 105°13′8″W	Public file LMS
KTSC^{1}	Pueblo (Colorado Springs)	8; 8 (VHF)	February 3, 1971^{1}	Television for Southern Colorado		22.4 kW	720 m (2,362 ft)	69170	38°44′43″N 104°51′39″W	Public file LMS
KRMJ	Grand Junction	18; 18 (UHF)	January 1, 1997	KRMA Grand Junction		17.7 kW	409 m (1,342 ft)	14042	39°3′58.4″N 108°44′45.7″W	Public file LMS
KRMU	Durango (Farmington, NM)	20; 20 (UHF)	December 3, 2004	KRMA Durango		12.6 kW	130 m (427 ft)	84224	37°15′46″N 107°53′58″W	Public file LMS

Notes:

- 1. KTSC joined RMPBS in 2000 and also covers Colorado Springs. "SC" could stand for either Southern Colorado or State College. Southern Colorado State College was CSU-Pueblo's name at the time the station signed on.

=== Subchannels ===
The signals of Rocky Mountain PBS' stations are multiplexed:

Rocky Mountain PBS subchannels
Subchannel	Res.	Short name	Programming
xx.1	1080i	xxxx-DT	PBS
xx.2	480i	Kids	PBS Kids
xx.3	480i	Create	Create
xx.4	480i	World	World

=== Analog-to-digital conversion ===
During 2009, in the lead-up to the analog-to-digital television transition that would ultimately occur on June 12, Rocky Mountain PBS shut down the analog transmitters of its stations on a staggered basis. Listed below are the dates each analog transmitter ceased operations as well as their post-transition channel allocations:

- KRMA-TV ended programming on its analog signal, over VHF channel 6, on June 12, 2009, the official date on which full-power television stations in the United States transitioned from analog to digital broadcasts under federal mandate. The station's digital signal remained on its pre-transition UHF channel 18, using virtual channel 6. As part of the SAFER Act, KRMA kept its analog signal on the air until July 12 to inform viewers of the digital television transition through a loop of public service announcements from the National Association of Broadcasters.
- KTSC shut down its analog signal, over VHF channel 8, on June 12, 2009. The station's digital signal relocated from its pre-transition UHF channel 26 to VHF channel 8 for post-transition operations.
- KRMJ shut down its analog signal, over UHF channel 18, on June 12, 2009. The station's digital signal relocated from its pre-transition UHF channel 17 to channel 18 for post-transition operations.

KRMU signed on in December 2004 as a digital-only station, although it also had endured a temporary shutdown in early 2009 in final preparation for the transition.

=== Translators ===
In addition to its four full-service television stations, Rocky Mountain PBS operates one of the largest translator networks in the country, serving portions of Colorado, Wyoming, Kansas, Nebraska and Utah. KRMA feeds two translators in Boulder and Fort Collins. KTSC feeds 10 translators in rural southern Colorado, and KRMJ feeds 13 translators serving rural western Colorado. The other translators are operated by community groups that pick up one of the three Rocky Mountain PBS regional feeds, and carry the signals onward through their systems.

All 25 translators within the RMPBS system operate as digital signals, and as such carry the primary channel and two subchannels from their respective parent transmitters.

- K35OR-D Aguilar (translates KTSC)
- K13XW-D Akron (translates KRMA-TV)
- K36GX-D Basalt (translates KRMJ)
- K24HQ-D Boulder (translates KRMA-TV)
- K31CW-D Carbondale (translates KRMJ)
- K33IW-D Coaldale (translates KTSC)
- K11PS-D Collbran (translates KRMJ)
- K24JO-D Crawford (translates KRMJ)
- K35OO-D Del Norte (translates KTSC)
- K19KN-D Eads, etc. (translates KTSC)
- KRMA-TV (DRT) Fort Collins (translates KRMA-TV)
- K29IT-D Gateview (translates KTSC)
- K25PC-D Gateway (translates KRMJ)
- K32NO-D Glenwood Springs (translates KRMJ)
- K28HA-D Grand Valley (translates KRMJ)
- K32NU-D Haxtun (translates KRMA-TV)
- K02QI-D Hesperus (translates KRMU)
- K15FD-D Holyoke (translates KRMA-TV)
- K20HM-D Idalia (translates KRMA-TV)
- K36IH-D Ignacio (translates KRMJ)
- K35OM-D La Veta (translates KTSC)
- K29HM-D Lake George (translates KTSC)
- K31NI-D Lamar (translates KTSC)
- K29JL-D Las Animas (translates KTSC)
- K07PA-D Manitou Springs (translates KTSC)
- K33PB-D Mesa (translates KRMJ)
- K32CW-D Montrose (translates KRMJ)
- K35NS-D Montrose (translates KRMJ)
- K06GW-D New Castle (translates KRMJ)
- K13SN-D Nucla (translates KRMJ)
- K09PJ-D Ouray (translates KRMJ)
- K35ON-D Paonia (translates KRMJ)
- K26FM-D Peetz (translates KRMJ)
- K23DX-D Pitkin (translates KTSC)
- K26GX-D Pleasant Valley (translates KRMA-TV)
- K07ZG-D Powderhorn Valley (translates KTSC)
- K19HG-D Redstone (translates KRMJ)
- K31IW-D Ridgway (translates KRMJ)
- K32HL-D Rulison (translates KRMJ)
- K31IX-D Salida (translates KTSC)
- K35OQ-D San Luis (translates KTSC)
- K32IK-D San Luis Valley (translates KTSC)
- K20OE-D Silt (translates KRMJ)
- K26LH-D Snowmass Village (translates KRMJ)
- K08OX-D Thomasville (translates KRMJ)
- K15GL-D Trinidad, Valdez, etc. (translates KTSC)
- K15ED-D Waunita Hot Springs (translates KTSC)
- K27OV-D Woody Creek (translates KRMJ)

== See also ==
- American Archive of Public Broadcasting for some KRMA (now Rocky Mountain PBS) shows, documentaries, and serials.
- KBDI-TV, a secondary PBS station in Broomfield.
