= KRHW =

- Sikeston, Missouri; United States
- Broadcast area: Missouri Bootheel
- Frequency: 1520 KHz
- Branding: 1520 & 98.9 KRHW

Programming
- Format: Classic Country

Ownership
- Owner: Withers Broadcasting; (Withers Broadcasting Company of Southeast Missouri, LLC)
- Sister stations: WREZ, WMOK, WZZL, KGMO, KREZ, KBXB, KBHI, KJXX, KAPE, KYRX, WKIB

History
- Former call signs: KMPL (1966–1997)

Technical information
- Licensing authority: FCC
- Facility ID: 16550
- Class: B
- Power: 5,000 watts (day); 5,000 watts (critical hours); 1,600 watts (night)
- Transmitter coordinates: 36°49′25.2″N 89°35′45.3″W
- Translators: 94.9 K235CY (Sikeston); 98.9 FM (see section)

Links
- Public license information: Public file; LMS
- Webcast: Listen Live
- Website: www.krhw.com

KRHW is a radio station broadcasting a classic country format. Licensed to Sikeston, Missouri, the station serves the Missouri Bootheel region of Southeast Missouri, and operates on 1520 kHz in the AM radio band. KRHW is owned by Withers Broadcasting Company of Southeast Missouri, LLC.

KRHW's skywave signal has been received as far north as the Quad Cities and Chicago and as far south as New Orleans. However, KRHW must protect the nighttime skywave signals of Class A clear-channel stations KOKC Oklahoma City and WWKB in Buffalo, which also transmit on 1520 kHz. The station reduces its power from 5,000 watts in the daytime to 1,600 watts at night. KRHW has an extremely directional antenna pattern aimed to the north and south with deep nulls to the east and west. It uses a six-tower array to achieve its complex nighttime signal.

Prior to August 17, 1997, the station's call sign was KMPL.

== Translators ==
KRHW broadcasts on FM translator K255AW on 98.9 MHz to help make up for the shortfall in the station's nighttime signal to the east and west of the main AM station's transmitter site which includes Sikeston, and many surrounding rural portions of Scott and New Madrid counties, as well as Stoddard County to the west, Mississippi County to the east, and even far southwestern portions of Cape Girardeau County, far southeastern portions of Bollinger County, and the areas of Alexander County in extreme southern Illinois just west of Cairo and southeast of Cape Girardeau proper. The transmitter site for K255AW is located along the Scott–Stoddard county line.

Call sign	Frequency	City of license	FID	ERP (W)	HAAT	Class	FCC info
K235CY	94.9 FM	Sikeston, Missouri	202399	250	67 m (220 ft)	D	LMS
K255AW	98.9 FM	Sikeston, Missouri	153458	250	116.1 m (381 ft)	D	LMS
