= WKIB =

Radio station in Anna, Illinois, serving Cape Girardeau, Missouri

Coordinates: 37.3623°N 89.5220°W

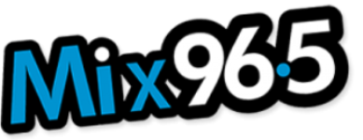
- Anna, Illinois; United States
- Broadcast area: Cape Girardeau, Missouri
- Frequency: 96.5 MHz
- Branding: Mix 96.5, The Heartland's Hit Music Station

Programming
- Format: Contemporary Hit Radio

Ownership
- Owner: Withers Broadcasting; (WKIB, LLC)
- Sister stations: KAPE, KBHI, KBXB, KGMO, KJXX, KREZ, KRHW, KYRX

Technical information
- Licensing authority: FCC
- Class: C2
- ERP: 50,000 Watts
- HAAT: 228 meters (748 ft)

Links
- Public license information: Public file; LMS
- Website: http://www.mix965.net

WKIB (96.5 FM, "Mix 96.5") is a Top 40 music formatted radio station licensed to Anna, Illinois, and serving Southeast Missouri, Southern Illinois, and Western Kentucky. The station's transmitter is located in a rural area north of Cape Girardeau, Missouri.
