= List of assets owned by Nexstar Media Group =

The following is a list of assets owned by Nexstar Media Group. This list also includes all assets owned by Tegna Inc., an autonomous, wholly-owned subsidiary of Nexstar.

== Broadcasting ==
=== Television ===
Stations are arranged alphabetically by state and by city of license.

Media market	State/Dist.	Station	Purchased	Affiliation	Notes
Birmingham	Alabama	WIAT	2017	The CW	
Dothan	Alabama	WDHN	2003	ABC	
Huntsville	Alabama	WHDF	2018	The CW	
Huntsville	Alabama	WHNT-TV	2019	CBS	
Huntsville	Alabama	WZDX	2026	Fox; MyTV (DT2)	
Mobile	Alabama	WFNA	2017	The CW	
Mobile	Alabama	WKRG-TV	2017	CBS; The CW (DT2)	
Flagstaff	Arizona	KNAZ-TV	2026	NBC	(Note: Satellite of KPNX.)
Mesa–Prescott–Phoenix	Arizona	KAZT-TV	2024	The CW	(Note: Owned by Londen Media Group.)
Mesa–Prescott–Phoenix	Arizona	KPNX	2026	NBC	
Tucson	Arizona	KMSB	2026	Fox	(Note: Operated by third parties.)
Tucson	Arizona	KTTU	2026	The CW	
Fayetteville	Arkansas	KNWA-TV	2004	NBC; Fox (DT2)	
Fayetteville	Arkansas	KXNW	2019	MyTV	
Fort Smith	Arkansas	KFTA-TV	2004	Fox; NBC (DT2)	
Fort Smith	Arkansas	KFSM-TV	2026	CBS	
Little Rock	Arkansas	KARK-TV	2003	NBC	
Little Rock	Arkansas	KARZ-TV	2009	MyTV	
Little Rock	Arkansas	KLRT-TV	2013	Fox	(Note: Owned by Mission Broadcasting.)
Little Rock	Arkansas	KASN	2013	The CW	
Little Rock	Arkansas	KTHV	2026	CBS	
Bakersfield	California	KGET-TV	2013	NBC; The CW (DT2); Telemundo (DT3)	
Bakersfield	California	KKEY-LD	2013	Telemundo	
Fresno	California	KGPE	2013	CBS	
Fresno	California	KSEE	2013	NBC	
Los Angeles	California	KTLA	2019	The CW	
Sacramento	California	KTXL	2019	Fox	
Sacramento	California	KXTV	2026	ABC	
San Diego	California	KUSI-TV	2023	The CW	
San Diego	California	KSWB-TV	2019	Fox	
San Diego	California	KFMB-TV	2026	CBS	
San Francisco	California	KRON-TV	2017	The CW	
Colorado Springs–Pueblo	Colorado	KXRM-TV	2017	Fox	
Colorado Springs–Pueblo	Colorado	KXTU-LD	2017	The CW	
Denver	Colorado	KWGN-TV	2019	The CW	
Denver	Colorado	KDVR	2019	Fox	
Denver	Colorado	KUSA	2026	NBC	
Denver	Colorado	KTVD	2026	MyTV	
Durango	Colorado	KREZ-TV	2017	Fox; Independent (DT2)	(Note: Satellite of KRQE.)
Fort Collins	Colorado	KFCT	2019	Fox	(Note: Satellite of KDVR.)
Grand Junction	Colorado	KFQX	2014	Fox	
Grand Junction	Colorado	KREX-TV	2014	CBS; MyTV (DT3)	
Grand Junction	Colorado	KGJT-CD	2014	MyTV	
Montrose	Colorado	KREY	2014	CBS (DT3); Fox (DT4)	(Note: Satellite of KREX-TV.)
Hartford–New Haven–Waterbury	Connecticut	WTNH	2017	ABC	
Hartford–New Haven–Waterbury	Connecticut	WCTX	2017	The CW	
Hartford–New Haven–Waterbury	Connecticut	WTIC-TV	2026	Fox	
Hartford–New Haven–Waterbury	Connecticut	WCCT-TV	2026	MyTV	
Washington, D.C.	District of Columbia	WDCW	2019	The CW	
Washington, D.C.	District of Columbia	WDVM-TV	2003	Independent	
Washington, D.C.	District of Columbia	WUSA	2026	CBS	
Jacksonville	Florida	WJXX	2026	ABC	
Jacksonville	Florida	WTLV	2026	NBC	
Panama City	Florida	WMBB	2014	ABC; The CW (DT2)	
Tampa–St. Petersburg	Florida	WFLA-TV	2017	NBC	
Tampa–St. Petersburg	Florida	WTSP	2026	CBS	
Tampa–St. Petersburg	Florida	WTTA	2017	The CW	
Tampa–St. Petersburg	Florida	WSNN-LD	2023	MyTV	
Atlanta	Georgia	WXIA-TV	2026	NBC	
Atlanta	Georgia	WATL	2026	MyTV	
Augusta	Georgia	WJBF	2017	ABC; The CW (DT2)	
Columbus	Georgia	WRBL	2017	CBS	
Macon	Georgia	WMAZ-TV	2026	CBS; The CW (DT2)	
Savannah	Georgia	WSAV-TV	2017	NBC; The CW/MyTV (DT2)	
Hilo	Hawaii	KHAW-TV	2017	Fox; The CW (DT2)	(Note: Satellite of KHON-TV.)
Hilo	Hawaii	KGMD-TV	2019	MyTV	(Note: Satellite of KHII-TV.)
Honolulu	Hawaii	KHON-TV	2017	Fox; The CW (DT2)	
Honolulu	Hawaii	KHII-TV	2019	MyTV	
Wailuku	Hawaii	KAII-TV	2017	Fox; The CW (DT2)	
Wailuku	Hawaii	KGMV	2019	MyTV	
Boise	Idaho	KTVB	2026	NBC	
Twin Falls	Idaho	KTFT-LD	2026	NBC	(Note: Satellite of KTVB.)
Chicago	Illinois	WGN-TV	2019	The CW	
Moline	Illinois	WQAD-TV	2026	ABC; MyTV (DT2)	
Peoria	Illinois	WMBD-TV	1999	CBS	
Peoria	Illinois	WYZZ-TV	2001	Fox	(Note: Owned by Cunningham Broadcasting.)
Rockford	Illinois	WQRF-TV	2003	Fox	
Rockford	Illinois	WTVO	2003	ABC; MyTV (DT2)	
Champaign	Illinois	WCIA	1999	CBS; MyTV (DT2)	
Champaign	Illinois	WCIX	1999	MyTV; CBS (DT2)	
Evansville	Indiana	WEHT	2011	ABC	
Evansville	Indiana	WTVW	2003	The CW	
Fort Wayne	Indiana	WANE-TV	2017	CBS	
Indianapolis	Indiana	WTTV	2019	CBS	
Indianapolis	Indiana	WXIN	2019	Fox	
Indianapolis	Indiana	WTHR	2026	NBC	
Indianapolis	Indiana	WALV-CD	2026	MeTV	
Kokomo	Indiana	WTTK	2019	CBS	(Note: Satellite of WTTV.)
Terre Haute	Indiana	WTWO	1997	NBC; The CW (DT2)	
Terre Haute	Indiana	WAWV-TV	2003	ABC	
Davenport	Iowa	WHBF-TV	2013	CBS	
Davenport	Iowa	KLJB	2016	Fox; MeTV (DT2)	
Davenport	Iowa	KGCW	2014	The CW	
Ames–Des Moines	Iowa	WHO-DT	2019	NBC	
Ames–Des Moines	Iowa	WOI-DT	2026	ABC	
Ames–Des Moines	Iowa	KCWI-TV	2026	The CW	
Sioux City	Iowa	KCAU-TV	2013	ABC	
Garden City	Kansas	KSNG	2017	NBC; Telemundo (DT2)	(Note: Satellite of KSNW.)
Great Bend	Kansas	KSNC	2017	NBC; Telemundo (DT2)	
Salina	Kansas	KSNL-LD	2017	NBC	
Topeka	Kansas	KSNT	2017	NBC; Fox (DT2)	
Topeka	Kansas	KTMJ-CD	2017	Fox	
Topeka	Kansas	KTKA-TV	2017	ABC; The CW (DT3)	(Note: Owned by Vaughan Media.)
Wichita	Kansas	KSNW	2017	NBC; Telemundo (DT2)	
Lexington	Kentucky	WDKY-TV	2020	Fox	
Louisville	Kentucky	WHAS-TV	2026	ABC	
Baton Rouge	Louisiana	WGMB-TV	2015	Fox; The CW (DT2)	
Baton Rouge	Louisiana	WBRL-CD	2015	The CW	
Baton Rouge	Louisiana	WVLA-TV	2015	NBC	(Note: Owned by White Knight Broadcasting.)
Baton Rouge	Louisiana	KZUP-CD	2016	Independent	
Lafayette	Louisiana	KLFY-TV	2017	CBS; The CW (DT2)	
Monroe	Louisiana	KARD	2003	Fox; The CW (DT2)	
Monroe	Louisiana	KTVE	2007	NBC	
New Orleans	Louisiana	WGNO	2019	ABC	
New Orleans	Louisiana	WNOL-TV	2019	The CW	
New Orleans	Louisiana	WWL-TV	2026	CBS	
New Orleans	Louisiana	WUPL	2026	MyTV	
Shreveport	Louisiana	KTAL-TV	2000	NBC	
Shreveport	Louisiana	KMSS-TV	2015	Fox	
Shreveport	Louisiana	KSHV-TV	2015	MyTV	
Portland	Maine	WCSH	2026	NBC	
Bangor	Maine	WLBZ	2026	NBC	(Note: Semi-satellite of WCSH.)
Springfield	Massachusetts	WFXQ-CD	2017	NBC; The CW (DT2)	(Note: Translator of WWLP.)
Springfield	Massachusetts	WWLP	2017	NBC; The CW (DT2)	
Battle Creek	Michigan	WOTV	2017	ABC; The CW (DT2)	
Grand Rapids	Michigan	WOOD-TV	2017	NBC	
Grand Rapids	Michigan	WXSP-CD	2017	MyTV	
Grand Rapids	Michigan	WZZM	2026	ABC	
Lansing	Michigan	WLNS-TV	2017	CBS	
Lansing	Michigan	WLAJ	2017	ABC; The CW (DT2)	
Minneapolis–Saint Paul	Minnesota	KARE	2026	NBC	
Jackson	Mississippi	WJTV	2017	The CW; Independent (DT2)	
Hattiesburg–Laurel	Mississippi	WHLT	2017	CBS; The CW (DT2)	(Note: Semi-satellite of WJTV.)
Natchez	Mississippi	WNTZ-TV	2015	Fox/MyTV	
Joplin	Missouri	KSNF	1998	NBC	
Joplin	Missouri	KODE-TV	2002	ABC	
Kansas City	Missouri	WDAF-TV	2019	Fox	
St. Louis	Missouri	KTVI	2019	Fox	
St. Louis	Missouri	KPLR-TV	2019	The CW	
St. Louis	Missouri	KSDK	2026	NBC	
Springfield–Branson	Missouri	KOZL-TV	2003	MyTV	
Springfield–Branson	Missouri	KRBK	2018	Fox	
Springfield–Branson	Missouri	KOLR	2003	CBS	
Billings	Montana	KSVI	2003	ABC; The CW (DT2)	
Billings	Montana	KHMT	2003	Fox	
McCook	Nebraska	KSNK	2017	NBC; Telemundo (DT2)	
Las Vegas	Nevada	KLAS-TV	2015	CBS	
Albuquerque–Santa Fe	New Mexico	KRQE	2017	Fox; Independent (DT2)	
Albuquerque–Santa Fe	New Mexico	KWBQ	2017	The CW	
Albuquerque–Santa Fe	New Mexico	KASY-TV	2017	MyTV	
Roswell	New Mexico	KBIM-TV	2017	Fox; Independent (DT2)	
Roswell	New Mexico	KRWB-TV	2017	The CW	(Note: Satellite of KWBQ.)
Albany–Schenectady	New York	WTEN	2017	ABC	
Albany–Schenectady	New York	WXXA-TV	2017	Fox	
Binghamton	New York	WBGH-CD	2012	NBC	
Binghamton	New York	WIVT	2012	ABC	
Buffalo	New York	WIVB-TV	2017	CBS	
Buffalo	New York	WNLO	2017	The CW	
Buffalo	New York	WGRZ	2026	NBC	
Elmira	New York	WETM-TV	2012	NBC	
New York	New York	WPIX	2020	The CW	
Rochester	New York	WROC-TV	1999	CBS	
Syracuse	New York	WSYR-TV	2012	ABC	
Utica–Rome	New York	WFXV	2003	Fox; The CW (DT2)	
Utica–Rome	New York	WPNY-LD	2003	MyTV	
Utica–Rome	New York	WUTR	2003	ABC; MyTV (DT2)	
Watertown	New York	WWTI	2012	ABC; The CW (DT2)	(Note: Semi-satellite of WSYR-TV.)
Charlotte	North Carolina	WJZY	2020	Fox	
Charlotte	North Carolina	WMYT-TV	2020	The CW	
Charlotte	North Carolina	WCNC-TV	2026	NBC	
Greensboro	North Carolina	WGHP	2019	Fox	
Greensboro	North Carolina	WFMY-TV	2026	CBS	
Greenville–New Bern	North Carolina	WNCT-TV	2017	CBS; The CW (DT2)	
Raleigh–Durham	North Carolina	WNCN	2017	CBS	
Bismarck	North Dakota	KXMB-TV	2016	The CW	
Dickinson	North Dakota	KXMA-TV	2016	The CW	(Note: Satellite of KXMB-TV.)
Minot	North Dakota	KXMC-TV	2016	The CW	
Williston	North Dakota	KXMD-TV	2016	The CW	
Cleveland–Akron	Ohio	WJW	2019	Fox	
Cleveland–Akron	Ohio	WBNX-TV	2025	The CW	
Cleveland–Akron	Ohio	WKYC	2026	NBC	
Columbus	Ohio	WCMH-TV	2017	NBC	
Columbus	Ohio	WBNS-TV	2026	CBS	
Dayton–Springfield	Ohio	WDTN	2017	NBC	
Dayton–Springfield	Ohio	WBDT	2017	The CW	
Toledo	Ohio	WTOL	2026	CBS	
Toledo	Ohio	WUPW	2026	Fox	(Note: Owned by American Spirit Media.)
Youngstown	Ohio	WKBN-TV	2017	CBS	
Youngstown	Ohio	WYFX-LD	2017	Fox	
Youngstown	Ohio	WYTV	2017	ABC; MyTV (DT2)	
Oklahoma City	Oklahoma	KAUT-TV	2019	The CW	
Oklahoma City	Oklahoma	KFOR-TV	2019	NBC	
Portland	Oregon	KOIN	2017	CBS	
Portland	Oregon	KRCW-TV	2019	The CW	
Portland	Oregon	KGW	2026	NBC	
Altoona	Pennsylvania	WTAJ-TV	2006	CBS	
Erie	Pennsylvania	WJET-TV	1998	ABC; The CW (DT2)	
Erie	Pennsylvania	WFXP	1998	Fox	
Harrisburg–York	Pennsylvania	WHTM-TV	2017	ABC	
Harrisburg–York	Pennsylvania	WPMT	2026	Fox	
Philadelphia	Pennsylvania	WPHL-TV	2019	The CW; MyTV (DT2)	
Scranton–Wilkes-Barre	Pennsylvania	WBRE-TV	1998	NBC	
Scranton–Wilkes-Barre	Pennsylvania	WYOU	1996	CBS	
Scranton–Wilkes-Barre	Pennsylvania	WNEP-TV	2026	ABC	
Providence	Rhode Island	WPRI-TV	2017	CBS; MyTV (DT2)	
Providence	Rhode Island	WNAC-TV	2017	Fox; The CW (DT2)	
Charleston	South Carolina	WCBD-TV	2017	NBC; The CW (DT2)	
Columbia	South Carolina	WLTX	2026	CBS	
Florence–Myrtle Beach	South Carolina	WBTW	2017	CBS	
Greenville–Spartanburg	South Carolina	WSPA-TV	2017	The CW	
Greenville–Spartanburg	South Carolina	WYCW	2017	Independent	
Florence–Aberdeen	South Dakota	KDLO-TV	2017	CBS; MyTV (DT2); The CW (DT4)	(Note: Satellite of KELO-TV.)
Rapid City	South Dakota	KCLO-TV	2017	The CW	(Note: Semi-satellite of KELO-DT4.)
Reliance–Pierre	South Dakota	KPLO-TV	2017	CBS; MyTV (DT2); The CW (DT4)	
Sioux Falls	South Dakota	KELO-TV	2017	CBS; MyTV (DT2); The CW (DT4)	
Jackson	Tennessee	WJKT	2012	Fox	
Johnson City–Kingsport	Tennessee	WJHL-TV	2017	CBS; ABC (DT2)	
Knoxville	Tennessee	WATE-TV	2017	ABC	
Knoxville	Tennessee	WBIR-TV	2026	NBC	
Memphis	Tennessee	WREG-TV	2019	CBS	
Memphis	Tennessee	WATN-TV	2026	ABC	
Memphis	Tennessee	WLMT	2026	The CW	
Nashville	Tennessee	WKRN-TV	2017	ABC	
Abilene–Sweetwater	Texas	KTAB-TV	1999	CBS; Telemundo (DT2)	
Abilene–Sweetwater	Texas	KRBC-TV	2003	NBC	
Abilene–Sweetwater	Texas	KXVA	2026	Fox; MyTV (DT2)	
Amarillo	Texas	KAMR-TV	2003	NBC; MyTV (DT2)	
Amarillo	Texas	KCIT	1999	Fox	
Amarillo	Texas	KCPN-LD	1999	MyTV	
Austin	Texas	KXAN-TV	2017	NBC	
Austin	Texas	KNVA	2017	The CW	
Austin	Texas	KBVO	2017	MyTV	
Austin	Texas	KBVO-CD	2017	MyTV	(Note: Translator of KBVO.)
Austin	Texas	KVUE	2026	ABC	
Beaumont	Texas	KBMT	2026	ABC; NBC (DT2)	
Beaumont	Texas	KUIL-LD	2026	MyTV	
Brownsville–Harlingen–McAllen	Texas	KGBT-TV	2021	The CW; MyTV (DT2)	
Brownsville–Harlingen–McAllen	Texas	KVEO-TV	2015	NBC; CBS (DT2)	
Bryan–College Station	Texas	KYLE-TV	2015	MyTV; Fox (DT2)	
Bryan–College Station	Texas	KAGS-LD	2026	NBC	(Note: Semi-satellite of KCEN.)
Corpus Christi	Texas	KIII	2026	ABC	
Dallas–Fort Worth	Texas	KDAF	2019	The CW	
Dallas–Fort Worth	Texas	WFAA	2026	ABC	
Dallas–Fort Worth	Texas	KFAA-TV	2026	Independent	
El Paso	Texas	KTSM-TV	2015	NBC	
Houston	Texas	KIAH	2019	The CW	
Houston	Texas	KHOU	2026	CBS	
Houston	Texas	KTBU	2026	Quest	
Jacksonville–Tyler–Longview	Texas	KETK-TV	2015	NBC	
Jacksonville–Tyler–Longview	Texas	KFXK-TV	2015	Fox	
Jacksonville–Tyler–Longview	Texas	KTPN-LD	2015	MyTV	
Jacksonville–Tyler–Longview	Texas	KYTX	2026	CBS; The CW (DT2)	
Lufkin–Nacogdoches	Texas	KFXL-LD	2015	Fox	(Note: Translator of KFXK-TV.)
Lubbock	Texas	KLBK-TV	2003	CBS	
Lubbock	Texas	KAMC	2003	ABC	
Odessa–Midland	Texas	KMID	2000	ABC	
Odessa–Midland	Texas	KPEJ-TV	2015	Fox	
Odessa–Midland	Texas	KWES-TV	2026	NBC	
San Angelo	Texas	KLST	2004	CBS	
San Angelo	Texas	KSAN-TV	2003	NBC	
San Angelo	Texas	KIDY	2026	Fox; MyTV (DT2)	
San Antonio	Texas	KENS	2026	CBS	
Temple–Waco	Texas	KWKT-TV	2015	Fox; MyTV (DT2)	
Temple–Waco	Texas	KCEN-TV	2026	NBC	
Wichita Falls	Texas	KFDX-TV	1998	NBC; MyTV (DT2); The CW (DT3)	
Wichita Falls	Texas	KJTL	1999	Fox	
Wichita Falls	Texas	KJBO-LD	1999	MyTV	
Salt Lake City	Utah	KTVX	2012	ABC	
Salt Lake City	Utah	KUCW	2012	The CW	
Burlington	Vermont	WFFF-TV	2013	Fox	
Burlington	Vermont	WVNY	2013	ABC	
Hampton–Norfolk–Portsmouth	Virginia	WAVY-TV	2017	NBC	
Hampton–Norfolk–Portsmouth	Virginia	WVBT	2017	Fox; The CW (DT2)	
Hampton–Norfolk–Portsmouth	Virginia	WVEC	2026	ABC	
Richmond	Virginia	WRIC-TV	2017	ABC	
Roanoke–Lynchburg	Virginia	WFXR	2014	Fox	
Roanoke–Lynchburg	Virginia	WWCW	2014	The CW	
Seattle–Tacoma	Washington	KING-TV	2026	NBC	
Seattle–Tacoma	Washington	KONG	2026	Independent	
Spokane	Washington	KREM	2026	CBS	
Spokane	Washington	KSKN	2026	The CW	
Clarksburg–Fairmont–Morgantown	West Virginia	WBOY-TV	2017	NBC; ABC (DT2)	
Huntington–Charleston	West Virginia	WOWK-TV	2017	CBS	
Lewisburg–Bluefield–Beckley	West Virginia	WVNS-TV	2017	CBS; Fox/MyTV (DT2)	
Wheeling	West Virginia	WTRF-TV	2017	CBS; MyTV (DT2); ABC (DT3)	
Green Bay	Wisconsin	WFRV-TV	2011	CBS	
Eau Claire	Wisconsin	WEUX	2014	Fox	(Note: Satellite of WLAX.)
La Crosse	Wisconsin	WLAX	2014	Fox	

=== Radio ===
Media market	State	Station	Purchased	Current format
Chicago	Illinois	WGN	2019	Talk radio
Columbus	Ohio	WBNS	2026	Sports radio
Columbus	Ohio	WBNS-FM	2026	Sports radio

=== Cable channels ===
- NewsNation
- Cooking Channel (joint venture with Skydance Corporation, 31%)
- Food Network (joint venture with Skydance Corporation, 31%)
- NewsWatch 15

=== Digital multicast networks ===
- Antenna TV
- Quest
- Rewind TV
- True Crime Network

=== FAST streaming channels ===
- SportsGrid (joint venture with Anthem Sports & Entertainment)

=== Television networks ===
- The CW (co-owned [81.1%] with Skydance Corporation [18.9%])
  - The CW Plus

=== Radio networks ===
- Ohio News Network

== Digital ==
- BestReviews
- Border Report
- The CW App
- The Hill
- Lakana
- LIN Digital
- Captivate Network (part owner)
- Yashi

== Former stations ==
Media market	State	Station	Purchased	Sold	Notes
Phoenix	Arizona	KASW	2015	2019	
Glenwood Springs	Colorado	KREG-TV	2014	2017	
Jacksonville	Florida	WCWJ	2009	2017	
West Palm Beach–Fort Pierce	Florida	WTCN-CA	2009	2012	
West Palm Beach–Fort Pierce	Florida	WTVX	2009	2012	
West Palm Beach–Fort Pierce	Florida	WWHB-CA	2009	2012	
Fort Wayne	Indiana	WFFT-TV	2003	2017	
Indianapolis	Indiana	WIIH-CD	2017	2019	
Indianapolis	Indiana	WISH-TV	2017	2019	
Indianapolis	Indiana	WNDY-TV	2017	2019	
Lafayette	Louisiana	KADN-TV	2015	2017	
Lafayette	Louisiana	KLAF-LD	2015	2017	
Adams	Massachusetts	WCDC-TV	2017	2018	(Note: Satellite of WTEN.) (Note: License for this station was cancelled.)
Escanaba–Marquette	Michigan	WJMN-TV	2011	2024	(Note: Semi-satellite of WFRV-TV.)
St. Joseph	Missouri	KQTV	1997	2017	
Rochester	New York	WUHF	2005	2013	
Lebanon–Harrisburg	Pennsylvania	WLYH-TV	2006	2015	
Providence	Rhode Island	WLWC	2009	2012	
Austin	Texas	KEYE-TV	2009	2012	
Beaumont–Port Arthur	Texas	KBTV-TV	1998	2012	
Longview–Tyler	Texas	KLPN-LD	2015	2016	(Note: Satellite of KTPN-LD.)
Salt Lake City	Utah	KMYU	2009	2012	
Salt Lake City	Utah	KUTV	2009	2012	
Seattle–Tacoma	Washington	KCPQ	2019	2020	
Seattle–Tacoma	Washington	KZJO	2019	2020	
Milwaukee	Wisconsin	WITI	2019	2020	

=== Dormant or shuttered assets ===
- Chicagoland Television
- TV by the Numbers
- Tribune Studios
- WGN Sports
- Zap2it

== See also ==
- Lists of corporate assets
