= Withers Broadcasting =

American radio and television broadcast company

Withers Broadcasting Companies
- Company type: Private family business
- Industry: Broadcasting
- Founded: 1972
- Founder: W. Russell Withers, Jr
- Headquarters: 219 Withers Dr., Mount Vernon, Illinois, U.S.
- Area served: Illinois, Kentucky, and Missouri
- Products: Radio
- Owner: Dana Withers
- Website: www.mywithersradio.com

Withers Broadcasting Companies (also doing business as Dana Communications Corp.) is a radio broadcasting company based in southern Illinois. Founded in 1972 by the late W. Russell Withers, Jr., and now owned by his daughter Dana Withers, the company owns several radio stations across the United States, mainly in Southern Illinois and Southeast Missouri.

== Stations ==
=== Radio ===
==== Illinois ====
===== Centralia =====
- WILY 1210
- WRXX 95.3

===== Harrisburg =====
- WEBQ 1240
- WEBQ-FM 102.3

===== Marion =====
- WDDD-FM 107.3
- WFRX 1300/95.5
- WHET 97.7
- WISH-FM 98.9
- WMCL 1060
- WQRL 106.3
- WTAO-FM 105.1
- WVZA 92.7

===== Nashville =====
- WNSV 104.7

===== Mount Vernon =====
- WDML 106.9
- WMIX 940
- WMIX-FM 94.1

==== Kentucky ====
===== Paducah =====
- WGKY 95.9
- WREZ 105.5
- WZZL 106.7
- WMOK 920/93.7 (IL)

==== Missouri ====
===== Cape Girardeau =====
- KAPE 1550/95.7
- KGMO 100.7
- KREZ 104.7
- KYRX 97.3
- WKIB 96.5

===== Jackson =====
- KJXX 1170/101.9

===== Sikeston =====
- KRHW 1520/98.9
- KBHI 107.1
- KBXB 97.9

=== Television ===
Stations arranged alphabetically by state and by city of license.

City of license / Market	Station	Channel	Years owned	Current status
Grand Junction, CO	KJWA/KFQX	4	(Note: Owned by John Harvey Rees and operated by Withers from 1994 until 2003.)	Fox affiliate owned by Mission Broadcasting (Note: Operated by Nexstar Media Group.)
Grand Junction, CO	KREX-TV	5	1984–2003	CBS affiliate owned by Nexstar Media Group
Grand Junction, CO	K27CO/KGJT-LP	27	1998–2003	MyNetworkTV affiliate KGJT-CD, owned by Nexstar Media Group
Durango, CO	KREZ-TV (Note: Satellite of KREX-TV.)	6	1984–1995	CBS affiliate owned by Nexstar Media Group (Note: Current satellite of KRQE in Albuquerque, New Mexico.)
Glenwood Springs, CO	KREG-TV	3	1987–2003	MeTV owned-and-operated (O&O) by Weigel Broadcasting
Montrose, CO	KREY	10	1984–2003	CBS affiliate owned by Nexstar Media Group
Iron Mountain–Marquette, MI	WDHS	8	1996–2015	Defunct, license cancelled in 2015
Victoria, TX	KVCT	19	(Note: Owned by VictoriaVision, Inc. and operated by Withers from 1995 until 1999.)	Fox affiliate owned by SagamoreHill Broadcasting (Note: Operated through LMA by Morgan Murphy Media.)
Victoria, TX	KAVU-TV	25	1990–1999	ABC affiliate owned by Morgan Murphy Media
Weston–Clarksburg, WV	WDTV	5	1973–2017	CBS affiliate owned by Gray Television
Weston–Clarksburg, WV	WVFX	10 (Note: Broadcast in analog prior to 2009 on UHF channel 46.)	2007–2017	Fox affiliate owned by Gray Television
