= KREZ =

KREZ may refer to:

- KREZ (FM), a radio station (104.7 FM) licensed to Chaffee, Missouri, United States
- KREZ-TV, a television station (channel 6 analog/15 digital) licensed to Durango, Colorado, United States
