= WTAO-FM =

- Murphysboro, Illinois; United States
- Broadcast area: Marion-Carbondale, Illinois
- Frequency: 105.1 MHz
- Branding: TAO Rock 105

Programming
- Format: Active rock
- Affiliations: United Stations Radio Networks

Ownership
- Owner: Withers Broadcasting
- Sister stations: WDDD-FM, WFRX, WHET, WMIX, WMIX-FM, WVZA

History
- First air date: 1970
- Former call signs: WTAO (1969–1982); WTAO-FM (1982–2009); WVZA (2009–2018)

Technical information
- Licensing authority: FCC
- Facility ID: 37243
- Class: B1
- ERP: 25,000 watts
- HAAT: 94 meters (308 ft)
- Transmitter coordinates: 37°45′15″N 89°19′14″W

Links
- Public license information: Public file; LMS
- Webcast: Listen Live
- Website: rock105tao.com

WTAO-FM (105.1 MHz, "TAO Rock 105") is an active rock music formatted radio station licensed to Murphysboro, Illinois, serving the Carbondale, Illinois, Arbitron market. Formerly owned by Clear Channel, it is now owned by Withers Broadcasting. Prior to Clear Channel's ownership, WTAO-FM was owned by Cumulus Media.

== History ==
WTAO was established in 1970 for $14,000 by Bill Varecha as a freeform format FM station serving mainly the Carbondale market. The WTAO studio and broadcasting tower were located on "Fiddlers Ridge" in Murphysboro, Illinois, broadcasting on 104.9 FM. Varecha first pioneered FM rock radio at KNAC FM Long Beach California in 1967 and CHOM Montreal before bringing the new rock formats to WTAO FM and his college graduation site. He later became the founder of KKCO TV NBC Grand Junction, Colorado and other stations.

From 1970 until December 1981, WTAO played mainly deep album rock but aired an eclectic variety of music and other programming including jazz, bluegrass, folk, country rock and jazz fusion as well as serialized radio theater such as The Fourth Tower of Inverness, in addition to syndicated programming such as a broadcast version of the Mother Earth News and the King Biscuit Flower Hour. Live performances by local musicians were sometimes aired as well. In the early 1970s, early Sunday morning broadcasting included recordings of lectures by Baba Ram Dass. In later years, Sunday morning religious programming included "Jesus Solid Rock". Varecha, who currently owns Colorado station KRYD, sold WTAO for $700,000 in 1981. To the disappointment of many longtime listeners, programming changed overnight from free format album rock to a much more limited format that included current hits. On December 10, 1980 WTAO hosted a vigil for John Lennon who had been gunned down a day earlier. It was held at 12:30PM at the studio. An all day special broadcast featuring many of Lennon's singles and works from The Beatles were aired. A partial recording of this broadcast exists but is in a private collection.

According to station personnel from that period, before the sale, new albums were made available to DJs with suggested songs. Songs played from those albums were tracked to avoid playing any song more than once on the same day. (IIRC a song could be played twice a day if it was 12 hrs apart. We called such songs 'War Horses' if they got a lot of requests). For the bulk of any shift DJs were free to play whatever they wanted from the station's extensive album collection. These radio personalities often curated theme-based broadcasts in response to current social and weather conditions as well as audience requests. After the format change, a card file of "soft album rock" songs was mixed with current hit songs. DJs played through the songs on the cards and nothing else was allowed on the air.

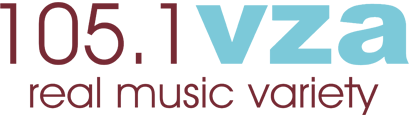
Logo for WVZA on 105.1 FM

WTAO-FM and sister station WVZA (92.7 FM) swapped frequencies in 2009 to accommodate WVZA's Southern Illinois University sports broadcasts. On July 23, 2018, it was announced that the stations would return to their original frequencies, effective August 1, 2018.
