= WEBQ =

WEBQ may refer to:

- WEBQ (AM), a radio station (1240 AM) licensed to Harrisburg, Illinois, United States
- WEBQ-FM, a radio station (102.3 FM) licensed to Eldorado, Illinois
