= WMIX =

WMIX may refer to:

- WMIX (AM), a radio station (940 AM) licensed to Mount Vernon, Illinois, United States
- WMIX-FM, a radio station (94.1 FM) licensed to Mount Vernon, Illinois, United States
- WrestleMania IX, a professional wrestling pay-per-view event produced by the World Wrestling Federation
