= WHET =

Illinois radio station broadcasting a classic country format

- West Frankfort, Illinois; United States
- Broadcast area: Marion-Carbondale (IL) area
- Frequency: 97.7 MHz
- Branding: US 97.7

Programming
- Format: Classic country
- Affiliations: Westwood One; St. Louis Cardinals Radio Network

Ownership
- Owner: Withers Broadcasting; (Withers Broadcasting of Southern Illinois, LLC)
- Sister stations: WDDD-FM, WFRX, WMIX, WMIX-FM, WTAO-FM, WVZA

History
- Former call signs: WFRX-FM (1979–1996); WQUL (1996–2009)

Technical information
- Licensing authority: FCC
- Facility ID: 53978
- Class: A
- ERP: 3,500 watts
- HAAT: 132 meters (433 ft)
- Transmitter coordinates: 37°45′15.00″N 88°56′5.00″W

Links
- Public license information: Public file; LMS
- Webcast: Listen Live
- Website: us977.com

WHET (97.7 FM) is a radio station broadcasting a classic country format. Licensed to West Frankfort, Illinois, United States, the station serves the Marion-Carbondale area. The station is owned by Withers Broadcasting and the broadcast license held by Withers Broadcasting of Southern Illinois, LLC. WHET features programming from Westwood One.

== History ==
WHET's previous logo.

The station was assigned call sign WFRX-FM on July 24, 1979. On October 1, 1996, the station changed its call sign to WQUL and on August 18, 2009, to the current WHET.

On March 9, 2011, WHET changed their format to classic country, branded as "US 97.7".
