= WVZA =

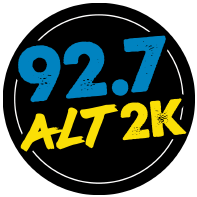
- Herrin, Illinois; United States
- Broadcast area: Marion-Carbondale
- Frequency: 92.7 MHz
- Branding: 92.7 ALT 2K

Programming
- Format: Alternative rock

Ownership
- Owner: Withers Broadcasting; (Withers Broadcasting of Southern Illinois, LLC)
- Sister stations: WDDD-FM, WFRX, WHET, WMIX, WMIX-FM, WTAO-FM

History
- First air date: March 1994
- Former call signs: WVZA (1991–2009); WTAO-FM (2009–2018)

Technical information
- Licensing authority: FCC
- Facility ID: 124
- Class: B1
- ERP: 25,000 watts
- HAAT: 100 meters (330 ft)
- Transmitter coordinates: 37.774°N 89.097°W

Links
- Public license information: Public file; LMS
- Webcast: Listen Live
- Website: alt2k.com

WVZA (92.7 FM, "92-7 ALT 2K") is an American alternative rock music formatted radio station licensed to Herrin, Illinois, serving the Marion-Carbondale, Illinois, area.

== History ==
92.7 FM previously aired a Top 40 (CHR) format branded as "KISS-FM", competing with WCIL-FM, under the ownership of Clear Channel Communications. It was divested and sold to Withers Broadcasting in 2008 as part of Clear Channel's plan to exit small market radio.

In July 2009, the top 40 format and call sign were moved to 105.1 FM in Murphysboro, Illinois, with the active rock format and WTAO-FM call sign coming over to 92.7 FM. The stations announced a reversal of the call sign swap on July 23, 2018, which took effect on August 1, 2018.

On May 24, 2019, WVZA changed their format from adult contemporary to alternative rock, branded as "92.7 Alt 2K".
