= CBS 3 =

CBS 3 may refer to one of the following television stations in the United States:

== Current ==
=== Owned-and-operated stations ===
- KYW-TV in Philadelphia, Pennsylvania

=== Affiliated stations ===
- KBJR-DT2, a digital channel of KBJR-TV in Duluth, Minnesota
- KBTX-TV in Bryan/College Station, Texas
  - Semi-satellite of KWTX-TV in Waco, Texas
- KEYT-DT2, a digital channel of KEYT-TV in Santa Barbara, California
- KIMT in Mason City, Iowa
- KLEW-TV in Lewiston, Idaho
- KMTV-TV in Omaha, Nebraska
- KRTV in Great Falls, Montana
- KTVO-DT2, a digital channel of KTVO in Kirksville, Missouri
- WBTV in Charlotte, North Carolina
- WCAX-TV in Burlington, Vermont
- WCIA in Champaign, Illinois
- WFSB in Hartford, Connecticut
- WRBL in Columbus, Georgia
- WREG-TV in Memphis, Tennessee
- WSHM-LD in Springfield, Massachusetts (cable channel; broadcasts on channel 33)
- WTKR in Hampton Roads, Virginia
- WWAY-DT2, a digital channel of WWAY in Wilmington, North Carolina
- WWMT in Grand Rapids, Michigan

== Formerly affiliated ==
- KCDO-TV in Sterling, Colorado (1963–1999)
- KDLH in Duluth, Minnesota (1955–2016)
- KGMV in Wailuku, Hawaii (1955–2009)
  - Was a satellite of KGMB in Honolulu, Hawaii
- KIDK in Idaho Falls, Idaho (1974–2021)
- KIEM-TV in Eureka, California (1953–1985)
- KREG-TV in Glenwood Springs, Colorado (1987–2017)
  - Was a satellite of KREX-TV in Grand Junction, Colorado
- WJMN-TV in Escanaba/Marquette, Michigan (1992–2022)
  - Was a semi-satellite of WFRV-TV in Green Bay, Wisconsin
