= WDDD-FM =

- Johnston City, Illinois; United States
- Broadcast area: Southern Illinois
- Frequency: 107.3 MHz
- Branding: W3D

Programming
- Format: Country music

Ownership
- Owner: Withers Broadcasting; (Withers Broadcasting of Southern Illinois, LLC)
- Sister stations: WFRX; WHET; WMIX; WMIX-FM; WTAO-FM; WVZA

History
- First air date: November 22, 1970

Technical information
- Licensing authority: FCC
- Facility ID: 123
- Class: B
- ERP: 50,000 watts
- HAAT: 150 meters (490 ft)
- Transmitter coordinates: 37.754°N 88.935°W

Links
- Public license information: Public file; LMS
- Website: w3dcountry.com

WDDD-FM (107.3 FM) is an American country music formatted radio station licensed to Johnston City, Illinois.

W3D has been a country station for 30+ years. On November 22, 1970, WDDD-FM first signed on. WDDD used to simulcast on 810 AM, which is no longer on the air.

Its sister stations are WFRX, WHET, WMIX, WMIX-FM, WTAO-FM, and WVZA.
