= KBXB =

- Sikeston, Missouri; United States
- Broadcast area: Cape Girardeau, Missouri
- Frequency: 97.9 MHz
- Branding: Freedom 97.9

Programming
- Format: Classic country
- Affiliations: Compass Media Networks

Ownership
- Owner: Withers Broadcasting; (Withers Broadcasting Company of Southeast Missouri, LLC)
- Sister stations: KBHI, KRHW, WKIB

History
- First air date: September 12, 1968 (as KSTG)
- Former call signs: KSTG (1968–1996)

Technical information
- Licensing authority: FCC
- Facility ID: 16548
- Class: C2
- ERP: 50,000 watts
- HAAT: 143 meters (469 feet)
- Transmitter coordinates: 36°59′52″N 89°38′52″W

Links
- Public license information: Public file; LMS
- Webcast: Listen Live
- Website: freedom979.com

KBXB (97.9 FM, "Freedom 97.9") is a radio station licensed to serve Sikeston, Missouri. The station is owned by Withers Broadcasting and licensed to Withers Broadcasting Company of Southeast Missouri, LLC. It airs a classic country music format. KBXB serves Sikeston and Southeast Missouri, Southern Illinois, Western Kentucky, extreme Northwestern Tennessee, and extreme Northeastern Arkansas.

The station was assigned the KBXB call letters by the Federal Communications Commission on June 29, 1996.

On May 27, 2022 at noon, KBXB changed its format from country to classic country, branded as "Freedom 97.9".

== Previous logo ==
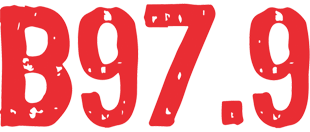
