= Cyrus Stokes Gentry =

American lawyer (1892–1967)

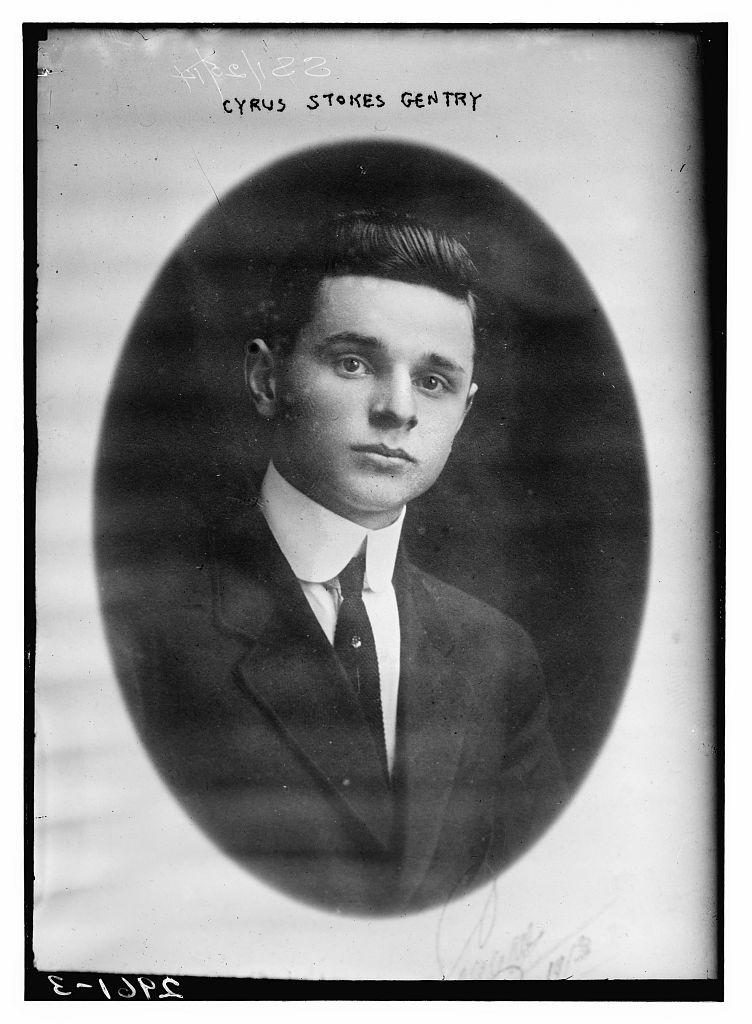

Cyrus S. Gentry (May 14, 1892 – November 2, 1967) was a vice-president and general counsel at Shell Oil. In 1914 he was a Rhodes Scholar from Illinois, attending Oxford University.

== Biography ==
He was born on May 14, 1892, in Eldorado, Illinois, to W. C. Gentry. He died on November 2, 1967, in the North Miami General Hospital in Florida.
