= KGJT =

KGJT may refer to:

- the ICAO code for Grand Junction Regional Airport
- KGJT-CD, a low-power television station (channel 27) licensed to Grand Junction, Colorado, United States
