= WREZ (disambiguation) =

WREZ is a radio station (105.5 FM) licensed to Metropolis, Illinois

WREZ may also refer to:

- WZKD, a radio station (950 AM) licensed to Montgomery, Alabama, which held the call sign WREZ from 1987 to 1988
- WMXS, a radio station (103.3 FM) licensed to Montgomery, Alabama, which held the call sign WREZ from 1977 to 1987
- WNED-FM, a radio station (94.5 FM) licensed to Buffalo, New York, which held the call sign WREZ from 1973 to 1975
