= WDHS (disambiguation) =

WDHS may refer to:

- WDHS, a television station in Iron Mountain, Michigan
- Wade Deacon High School, Widnes, Cheshire, England
- Waterdown District High School, Waterdown, Hamilton, Ontario, Canada
- Waterford District High School, Waterford, Ontario, Canada
- Western Dubuque High School, Epworth, Iowa, United States
- A defunct radio station in Gaston, Indiana
