= WILY =

- Centralia, Illinois; United States
- Frequency: 1210 kHz

Programming
- Language: English
- Format: Silent

Ownership
- Owner: Withers Broadcasting Companies; (WRXX, LLC)
- Sister stations: WRXX (95.3 FM)

History
- First air date: 1946
- Former call signs: WCNT (1946–1967)

Technical information
- Licensing authority: FCC
- Facility ID: 26624
- Class: D
- Power: 10,000 watts (day); 1,100 watts (critical hours); 3 watts (night)
- Transmitter coordinates: 38°28′55″N 89°8′56″W (day and critical hours); 38°31′27″N 89°8′3″W (night)
- Translators: 98.3 W252EC (Centralia); 98.7 W254BE (Centralia)

Links
- Public license information: Public file; LMS

WILY (1210 AM) is an American radio station licensed to serve the community of Centralia, Illinois. The station is owned by Dana Withers' Withers Broadcasting Companies, and its broadcast license is held by WRXX, LLC. The station, established in 1946 as "WCNT", was assigned the call sign "WILY" by the Federal Communications Commission (FCC) in 1967.

On June 1, 2026, the station went off the air along with some of its sister stations as part of a reorganization effort by the owner.

== Programming ==
WILY broadcast an oldies music format featuring the "Good Time Oldies" programming from Westwood One. As of January 2012, WILY's on-air personalities included Bruce Chandler in morning drive, JJ McKay on mid-days, Brad Pierce in afternoon drive, Peter McLaine on evenings, and Mike Shaw overnight. WILY also broadcast a one-hour talk show hosted by Tootie Cooksey each weekday. On Mondays, this was called Talk Time USA and called Hotline on Tuesday through Friday.

Former Logo

== Translators ==
WILY programming was also carried on two broadcast translator stations to extend or improve the coverage area of the station.

Broadcast translators for WILY
Call sign	Frequency	City of license	FID	ERP (W)	Class	FCC info
W252EC	98.3 FM	Centralia, Illinois	202597	250	D	LMS
W254BE	98.7 FM	Centralia, Illinois	152474	250	D	LMS
