= Eldorado City Hall =

- U.S. National Register of Historic Places
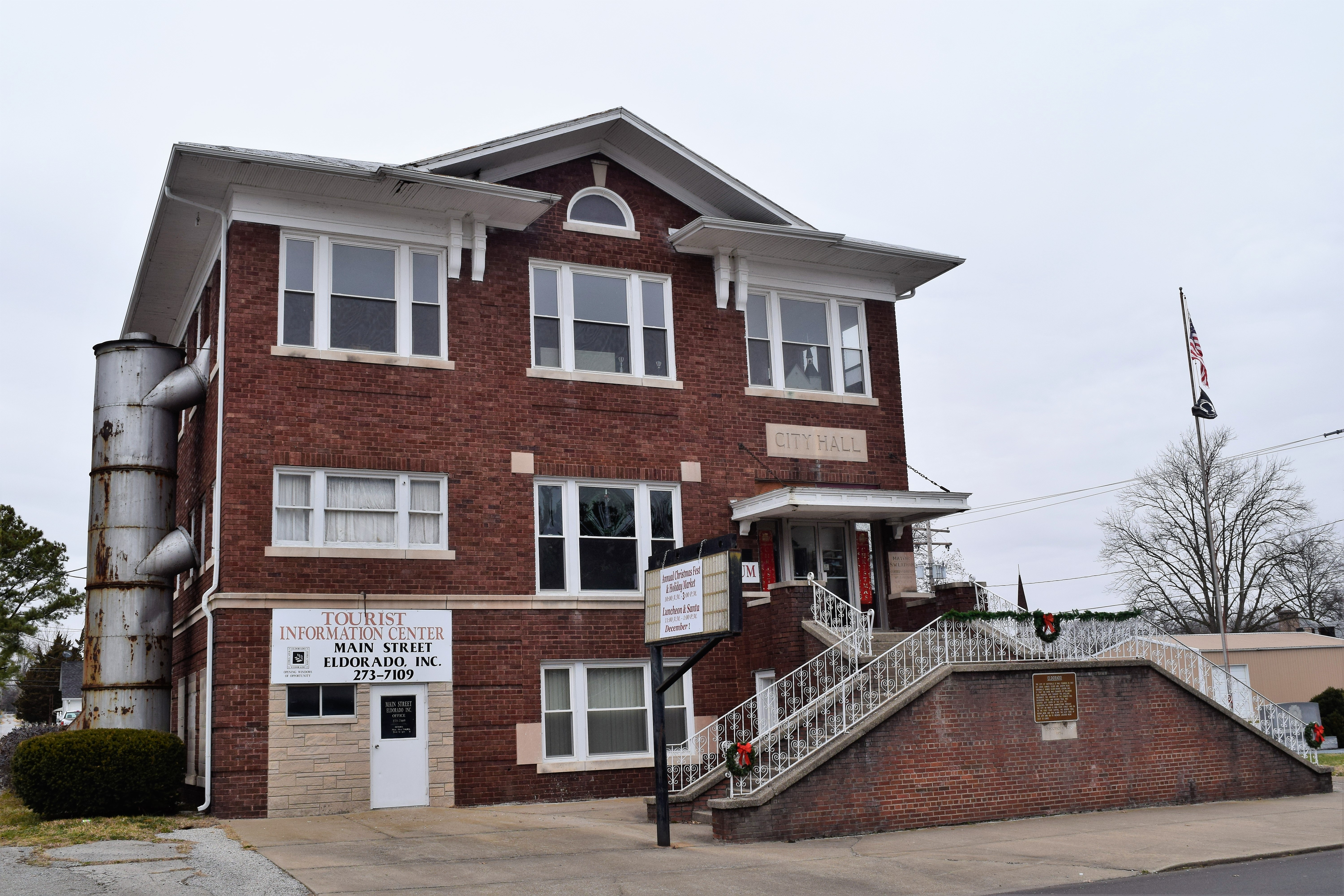

- Location within Illinois Location within the United States
- Location: 1604 Locust St., Eldorado, Illinois
- Coordinates: 37°48′44″N 88°26′32″W
- Area: less than one acre
- Built: 1924
- Built by: Miller & Simpson
- Architect: Boyle, H.E.,& Co.
- Architectural style: Classical Revival
- NRHP reference No.: 95001237
- Added to NRHP: November 7, 1995

The Eldorado City Hall, located at 1604 Locust St., is the former city hall of Eldorado, Illinois. Built in 1924, the building was Eldorado's first city hall; prior to its construction, the city government had been operated from the mayors' businesses. The architectural firm of Harry E. Boyle and Co. designed the building in the Classical Revival style. The brick building features a second-story entrance, brick quoins at each corner, a large dormer with a semicircular window on the front facade, and soffit ends supported by wooden brackets below the dormer. In addition to serving as the city hall, the building housed Eldorado's fire department, jail, and public library. The city continued to use the building until 1994, when a new building was constructed; the old city hall is now a local history museum.

The building was added to the National Register of Historic Places on November 7, 1995.
