= WQRL =

Coordinates: 37.931°N 88.681°W

- Benton, Illinois; United States
- Broadcast area: Southern Illinois / Marion / Harrisburg
- Frequency: 106.3 MHz
- Branding: Q106.3

Programming
- Format: Classic hits

Ownership
- Owner: Dana Communications Corporation

History
- First air date: October 1, 1973
- Former call signs: WQRX (1973–1982)

Technical information
- Licensing authority: FCC
- Facility ID: 15378
- Class: B1
- ERP: 12,500 watts
- HAAT: 140 meters (460 ft)

Links
- Public license information: Public file; LMS
- Webcast: Listen Live
- Website: wqrlradio.com

WQRL (106.3 FM, "Q106.3") is a radio station licensed to Benton, Illinois, covering Southern Illinois, including Marion, Benton, and Harrisburg. WQRL has a classic hits format and is owned by Dana Communications Corporation.

The station is an affiliate of the syndicated Pink Floyd program "Floydian Slip."

== History ==
=== WQRX ===
The station began broadcasting October 1, 1973, and originally held the call sign WQRX. It had an ERP of 3,000 watts at a HAAT of 300 feet. The station was branded "The Golden Voice of Southern Illinois", and had a variety format. In 1975, the station began airing easy listening music during the day and progressive rock at night. By 1980, the station had begun airing a top 40 format.

=== WQRL ===
In 1982, the station's call sign was changed to WQRL, and the station adopted an adult contemporary format. In February 1993, the station's format was changed to country music, airing programming from Unistar's Hot Country network. In 1994, the station's ERP was increased to 12,500 watts, at a HAAT of 459 feet. In July 1996, the station adopted an oldies format, which lasted for more than 2 decades. When the 2020s rolled along, its oldies format tweaked into a classic hits format.
