= WGKY =

Radio station in Wickliffe–Paducah, Kentucky

- Wickliffe, Kentucky; United States
- Broadcast area: Paducah, Kentucky; Charleston, Missouri
- Frequency: 95.9 MHz
- Branding: Fox Sports 95.9

Programming
- Format: Sports
- Affiliations: Fox Sports Radio

Ownership
- Owner: Withers Broadcasting; (Withers Broadcasting Company of Paducah, LLC)

History
- First air date: January 1987
- Former call signs: WCRG (1985–1986); WYMC-FM (1986–1991)

Technical information
- Licensing authority: FCC
- Facility ID: 53945
- Class: A
- ERP: 2,450 watts
- HAAT: 110 meters
- Transmitter coordinates: 36°56′17″N 88°58′1″W

Links
- Public license information: Public file; LMS
- Website: foxsports959.com

WGKY (95.9 FM) is a radio station broadcasting a sports format. Licensed to Wickliffe, Kentucky, United States, the station is owned by Dana Withers' Withers Broadcasting, through licensee Withers Broadcasting Company of Paducah, LLC, and features programming from Fox Sports Radio.

== History ==
The station went on the air as WCRG on May 9, 1985. On October 2, 1986, the station changed its call sign to WYMC-FM; then on February 15, 1991, to the current WGKY.

On August 3, 2022, WGKY changed its format from oldies to sports, branded as "Fox Sports 95.9".
