= WRXX =

- Centralia, Illinois; United States
- Frequency: 95.3 MHz
- Branding: X95

Programming
- Format: Contemporary hit radio

Ownership
- Owner: Withers Broadcasting; (WRXX, LLC)
- Sister stations: WILY

History
- First air date: December 24, 1964

Technical information
- Licensing authority: FCC
- Facility ID: 26625
- Class: A
- ERP: 5,500 watts
- HAAT: 100 meters (330 ft)
- Transmitter coordinates: 38°33′46″N 88°59′58″W

Links
- Public license information: Public file; LMS
- Webcast: Listen live
- Website: x95radio.com

WRXX (95.3 FM, "X95") is an American radio station licensed to Centralia, Illinois, United States. The station airs a Top 40 (CHR) format, and is currently owned by Dana Withers' Withers Broadcasting, through licensee WRXX, LLC.

Former logo
