= Eldorado, Illinois =

Eldorado
- City
- City of Eldorado
- According to the 1945 Film Daily Yearbook, the 500-seat Grand was one of three movie houses in operation at that time, which also included the Orpheum and the Nox. Today the former Grand is used as a meeting place for a fraternal order.
- Nickname: City of Daffodils
- Location of Eldorado in Saline County, Illinois.
- Coordinates: 37°48′41″N 88°26′30″W
- Country: United States
- State: Illinois
- County: Saline
- Founder: Samuel Elder and Joseph Read

Area
  - Total: 2.54 sq mi (6.59 km^{2})
  - Land: 2.50 sq mi (6.48 km^{2})
  - Water: 0.042 sq mi (0.11 km^{2})
- Elevation: 387 ft (118 m)

Population (2020)
  - Total: 3,743
  - Density: 1,495.3/sq mi (577.32/km^{2})
- Time zone: UTC-6 (CST)
  - Summer (DST): UTC-5 (CDT)
- ZIP code: 62930
- Area code: 618
- FIPS code: 17-23009
- GNIS ID: 2394639

Eldorado (/ˌɛldəˈreɪdoʊ, -də/) is a city in Saline County, Illinois, United States. As of the 2020 census, Eldorado had a population of 3,743. The population peaked in 1980 at 5,198. Although the city's name is spelled as if it were Spanish, the name was originally "Eldereado" or "Elder-Reado" (depending on the source)—a combination of the last names of the town's two founders, Judge Samuel Elder, his son William, grandson Francis Marion, and neighbor Joseph Read, and his brother William. According to legend, a signpainter for the railroad painted the name "Eldorado" on the train depot; as a result, the spelling and pronunciation (el-do-RAY-doh) was forever changed.

Eldorado is included in the Illinois–Indiana–Kentucky tri-state area and is a bedroom community in the Harrisburg micropolitan statistical area.

== History ==
Eldorado was first platted on May 24, 1858, by a surveyor named Martin D. Gillett. The post office was established on December 8 of that same year. Just before the Civil War, the first businesses were started in the town. The original village was incorporated in 1870. It was founded by Francis Elder and his neighbors who were brothers William and John Reed.

In the early days, Eldorado had several railroads which came through town. It was at an intersection of the Louisville & Nashville and Cairo & Vincennes railways. The "eastern extremity" of the Belleville & Eldorado Railway (St. Louis Short Line) also came through town. According to Neil Gale, "This settlement, by 1896, could boast of exceptional railroad facilities - The Illinois Central, The Louisville and Nashville, and The Chicago, Cleveland, Cincinnati and St. Louis. When the railroad company placed the name on the station, the name was spelled Eldorado, instead of Elderedo, and it has been known by that name since that time."

The city provided relief efforts to neighboring communities affected by the Ohio River Flood of 1937. Shelter was provided at the city hall, and food provided by the Calvary Baptist Church, led by the Red Cross with local help. When the Leap Day Tornado of 2012 struck nearby Harrisburg, Eldorado immediately provided emergency assistance.

Current and former residents often reflect with nostalgia growing up in Eldorado, and doing business in the downtown area. At the center of it is a five-way intersection. A Ben Franklin store stood for decades on the corner of Fourth and Locust streets. The Dairy Queen was a popular hangout, until it relocated outside of the downtown in the 1990s. At one time there were over 20 grocery stores in Eldorado, most were small neighborhood stores. Eventually, these stores and downtown businesses began to disappear due to job loss, population decrease, and the move to businesses on the highways.

The former city hall building is on the National Register of Historic Places. Eldorado has four official Historical Markers, with the most recent one unveiled on September 18, 2021.

Eldorado thrived for much of the late 1800s until the 1980s as a coal mining town, until several major mines shut down. Another major employer, Roundy's (formerly Scot Lad) closed in 2005, laying off 170 workers.

Today, the railroad tracks have been paved over in favor of bike paths, and most of the downtown businesses are gone.

=== Race relations ===
Black communities were subject to discrimination throughout the 1900s. A notable instance include a race riot which started on February 26, 1910 where an unidentified African American man and three white men started a gun battle. Armed mobs attacked the Black business centres shortly after the attack which resulted in Blacks leaving the town with many fleeing to Camden.

Eldorado was known as a sundown town until the 1960s.

== Geography ==
Eldorado is in the southeastern region of Southern Illinois. The nearest major city is St. Louis, Missouri (129 miles). Residents do a lot of business in Evansville, Indiana (59 miles), and Paducah, Kentucky (62 miles).

According to the 2010 census, Eldorado has a total area of 2.431 square miles (6.30 km^{2}), of which 2.39 square miles (6.19 km^{2}) (or 98.31%) is land and 0.041 square miles (0.11 km^{2}) (or 1.69%) is water.

It is located within the Wabash Valley seismic zone, and just north of the Cottage Grove Fault System.

The junction of the pioneer Kaskaskia and Goshen Trails was located just south of the city. The Goshen Trail began in Old Shawneetown, Illinois and ran along the east side of Eldorado and on to the Goshen Settlement, a community near the present day East St. Louis. It is just north of the Shawnee National Forest.

=== Climate ===
Average high temps are 67.5 °F, average lows 45.3 °F. Average temp 56.4 °F. Average annual precipitation-rainfall 47.46 inches. Average annual snowfall is 5 inches.

== Government ==
The current mayor is Rocky James (as of 2019). There is also an elected city council, city clerk, and city treasurer. Their offices are at city hall, located at 901 4th street.

== Demographics ==
Historical population
Census	Pop.	Note	%±
1900	1,445		—
1910	3,366		132.9%
1920	5,004		48.7%
1930	4,482		−10.4%
1940	4,891		9.1%
1950	4,500		−8.0%
1960	3,573		−20.6%
1970	3,876		8.5%
1980	5,198		34.1%
1990	4,536		−12.7%
2000	4,534		0.0%
2010	4,122		−9.1%
2020	3,743		−9.2%
U.S. Decennial Census

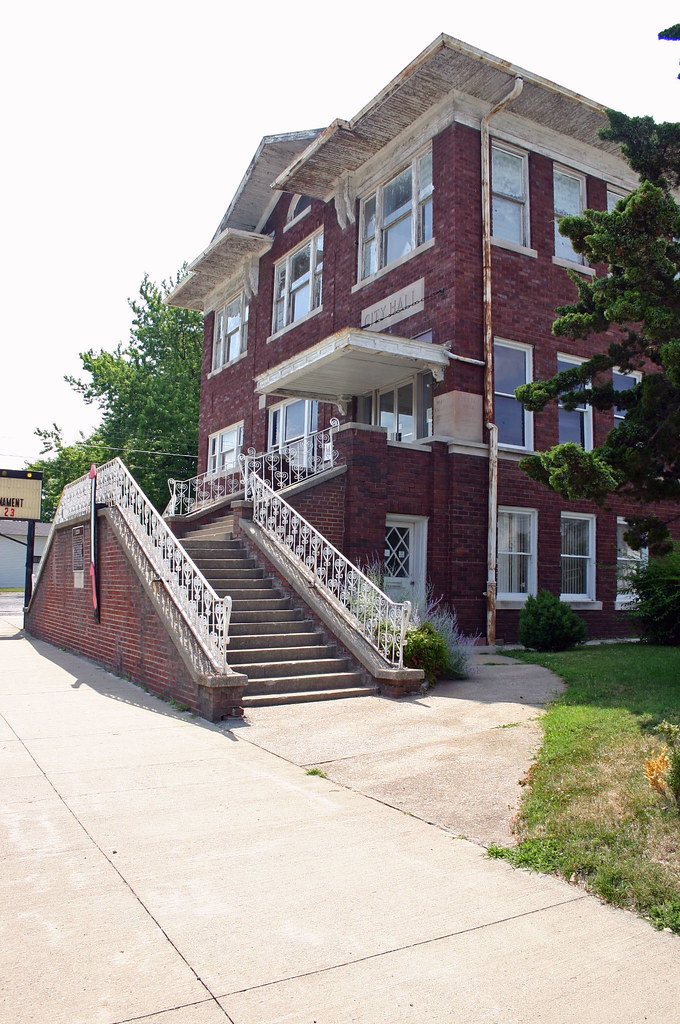
Old City Hall, now a museum

=== 2020 census ===
As of the 2020 census, Eldorado had a population of 3,743. The median age was 41.1 years. 22.0% of residents were under the age of 18 and 21.5% of residents were 65 years of age or older. For every 100 females there were 96.2 males, and for every 100 females age 18 and over there were 91.9 males age 18 and over.

0.0% of residents lived in urban areas, while 100.0% lived in rural areas.

There were 1,577 households in Eldorado, of which 26.8% had children under the age of 18 living in them. Of all households, 36.0% were married-couple households, 21.6% were households with a male householder and no spouse or partner present, and 33.7% were households with a female householder and no spouse or partner present. About 37.1% of all households were made up of individuals and 17.6% had someone living alone who was 65 years of age or older.

There were 1,900 housing units, of which 17.0% were vacant. The homeowner vacancy rate was 4.2% and the rental vacancy rate was 12.4%.

Racial composition as of the 2020 census
Race	Number	Percent
White	3,497	93.4%
Black or African American	22	0.6%
American Indian and Alaska Native	6	0.2%
Asian	7	0.2%
Native Hawaiian and Other Pacific Islander	0	0.0%
Some other race	41	1.1%
Two or more races	170	4.5%
Hispanic or Latino (of any race)	86	2.3%

=== 2010 census ===
As of the census of 2010 there were 4,122 people, 1,796 households, and 1,044 families residing in the city. There were 2,053 housing units. The racial makeup of the city was 97.3% White, 0.8% African American, 0.2% Native American, 0.1% Asian, 0.1% Pacific Islander, 0.4% from other races, and 1.1% from two or more races. Hispanic or Latino of any race were 1.3% of the population.

=== Demographic estimates ===
There were 1,945 households, out of which 28.3% had children under the age of 18 living with them, 38.1% were married couples living together, 14.1% had a female householder with no husband present, and 41.9% were non-families. The average household size was 2.21 and the average family size was 2.85.

The median age was 43 years. The unemployment rate was 17.5%.

=== Income and poverty ===
The median income for a household in the city was $30,799, and the median income for a family was $36,361. The per capita income for the city was $17,715. About 25.2% of families and 28.5% of the population were below the poverty line, including 30.6% of those under age 18 and 13.4% of those aged 65 or over.

=== Education ===
Education level of those aged 25 and over: 6.1% less than ninth grade; 11% grade 9–12 with no diploma; 32.1% high school graduates; 24.7% some college, no degree; 9.6% Associate degree; 12.3% Bachelor's degree; and 4.3% graduate level or higher. Overall, the percentage of high school graduates is 83%. Approximately 7% of the population are veterans.

== Housing ==
The median home value in 2010 was $45,900 with 56.6% valued below $50,000. No homes were valued $500,000 or greater. There were 1,855 housing units in the city, with 87.1% occupied. Of the 81.7%, 69% are owner-occupied, and 31% occupied by renters. Median rent rate was $619. The housing overall is aging, with 28.9% units built before 1939, and 12.9% of housing units were vacant. The city has been working to demolish derelict homes for several years.

== Media ==
Eldorado used to have the smallest daily newspaper in Illinois until recently when declining circulation and advertising revenue for the Eldorado Daily Journal forced its parent company to scale back publication to only three days per week. The Journal had been a daily paper since 1911.

Local television stations include WSIL channel 3 (ABC), WPSD channel 6 (NBC), KFVS channel 12 (CBS), WSIU channel 8 (PBS), and KBSI channel 23 (FOX).

Closest local radio station is WEBQ AM 1240 (Country), and WEBQ FM 102.3 (Adult Contemporary), based in nearby Harrisburg.

== Education ==
The Eldorado elementary school system consolidated in 1979, combining four schools (3 located in Eldorado, one from nearby Raleigh). Grades Pre-K through grade 5 attend Eldorado Elementary. Eldorado Middle School serves grades 6–8, and Eldorado High School grades 9–12. The high school mascot is the Eagles.

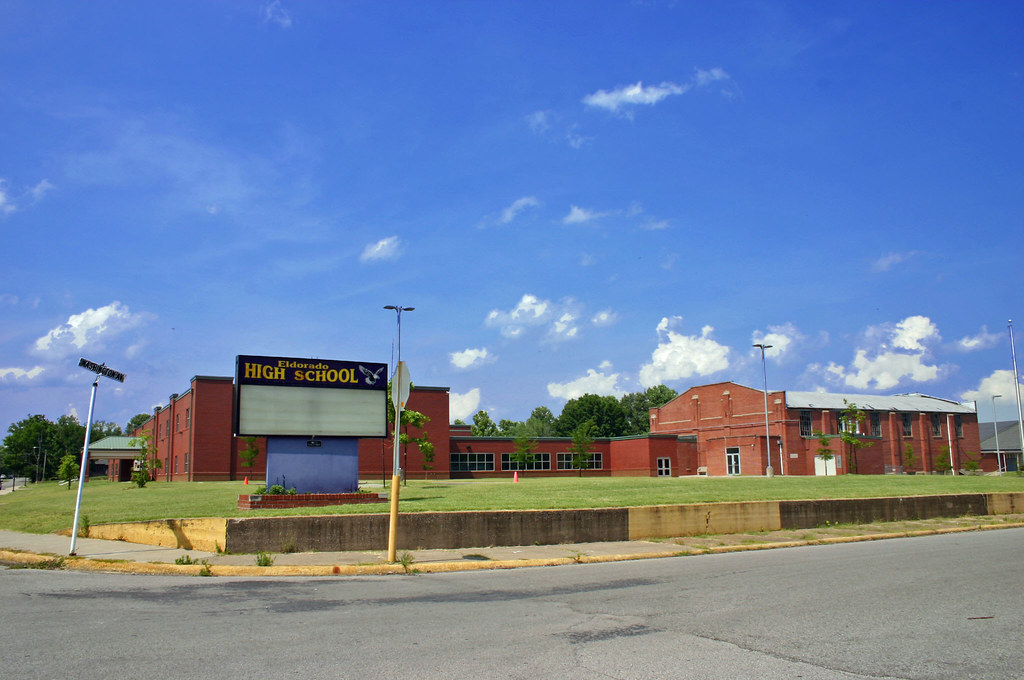
Eldorado High School

As of the beginning of the 2018–2019 school year, there were 1,157 students (Pre-K-12) enrolled in Eldorado Community Unit #4 schools (Elementary 598, Middle School 243, High School 351) The middle school and high schools were rated "commendable schools" on the 2018 Illinois School Report Card.

To the south of Eldorado is Southeastern Illinois College (junior college). The nearest major university is Southern Illinois University in Carbondale.

== Health care ==
In 1925, Dr. J.V. Ferrell founded Ferrell Hospital, which exists today as a 52-bed facility operated by Southern Illinois Healthcare. Effective March 1, 2004, SIH entered into an agreement with Alliant Management Services to return the hospital to local ownership and governance. On April 1, 2005, Ferrell Hospital Community Foundation became a stand-alone facility managed by Alliant Management Services. As Ferrell is a small hospital, services are routinely provided via other hospitals by transportation via ambulance for non-critical issues, and Air Evac Lifeteam Air Ambulance (for transport to Evansville, IN hospitals Deaconess, or St. Mary's) for critical emergencies. As of 2019, it is undergoing a significant expansion.

At one time, Eldorado supported an additional hospital, a 56-bed facility named Pearce Hospital (after another local physician). Pearce Hospital opened in 1949, and closed 40 years later, in 1989 due to financial issues and a dwindling patient load.

== Leisure activities ==
In downtown Eldorado there are several murals painted on the sides of old buildings. The artists were longtime residents Phyllis Finnie (1925–2019) and Zettie Shults (resident from 1963 to 2005).

Town & Country Days is an annual festival held every third weekend in September.

Just south of Eldorado are sightseeing opportunities at the Shawnee National Forest and Garden of the Gods. Cave-in-Rock is 32 miles southeast.

== Sports ==
Eldorado holds a few records within the Illinois High School Association (IHSA). Basketball star Mike Duff is ranked #28 for career points (2,558), #4 for most points in a season (1,097-accomplished in 1977), and #13 with highest scoring average, season (32.2-accomplished in 1977). In baseball, #6 for most consecutive wins at home (26).

In December 1977, tragedy struck when former Eldorado basketball standouts Mike Duff and Kevin Kingston were killed in the crash of Air Indiana Flight 216 shortly after takeoff in Evansville, Indiana. Both were members of the Evansville Aces basketball team. The high school gymnasium was renamed in their memory.

== George Harrison's First U.S. Gig ==
Eldorado is notable as being the location of George Harrison's first gig in America. On September 28, 1963, five months before The Beatles' first appearance on The Ed Sullivan Show brought them stardom in the United States, George Harrison performed at the Veterans of Foreign Wars (VFW) hall in Eldorado with a local band called The Four Vests. This was the first performance by a Beatle in the United States. At the time, Harrison and his brother were visiting their sister, Louise, who had recently relocated with her husband to nearby Benton. Around 75 people were entertained by Harrison at the VFW that evening.

== Popular culture ==
The book Murder in Little Egypt by Darcy O'Brien was centered in Eldorado. The subject of the book, Dr. John Dale Cavaness, practiced medicine in Eldorado.

== Notable residents ==
- Todd Duffee, mixed martial artist
- David Phelps, U.S. representative from Illinois
- William David Sanders, teacher killed during the Columbine High School massacre
- Maryanne Wolf, neuroscientist and author

== See also ==
- List of sundown towns in the United States
