= WISH-FM =

- Galatia, Illinois; United States
- Broadcast area: Harrisburg, Illinois; West Frankfort, Illinois; Benton, Illinois
- Frequency: 98.9 MHz
- Branding: WISH 98.9

Programming
- Format: Silent

Ownership
- Owner: Withers Broadcasting; (WISH Radio, LLC)
- Sister stations: WEBQ, WEBQ-FM

History
- First air date: 2001

Technical information
- Licensing authority: FCC
- Facility ID: 70601
- Class: A
- ERP: 4,100 watts
- HAAT: 122 meters (400 ft)
- Transmitter coordinates: 37°55′52.2″N 88°40′50.2″W

Links
- Public license information: Public file; LMS

WISH-FM (98.9 MHz) is a radio station licensed to Galatia, Illinois, United States. The station is owned by Dana Withers' Withers Broadcasting, through licensee WISH Radio, LLC.

The station aired a Millennial Hits format consisting of popular songs from the 1990s and 2000s. On June 1, 2026, the station went off the air along with some of its sister stations as part of a reorganization effort by the owner, with the final song being "Magic" by Coldplay.

Previous logo

Final logo
