= WMIX (AM) =

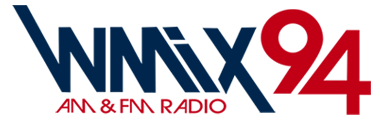
- Mount Vernon, Illinois; United States
- Frequency: 940 kHz
- Branding: WMIX 940

Programming
- Format: Soft oldies; Adult standards
- Affiliations: Westwood One; ("America's Best Music")

Ownership
- Owner: Withers Broadcasting; (Withers Broadcasting Company of Illinois, LLC)
- Sister stations: WDDD-FM, WFRX, WHET, WMIX-FM, WTAO-FM, WVZA

History
- First air date: 1946
- Call sign meaning: Mix of musical styles

Technical information
- Licensing authority: FCC
- Facility ID: 73096
- Class: B
- Power: 5,000 watts (day); 1,500 watts (night)
- Transmitter coordinates: 38°22′14″N 88°55′24″W (day); 38°21′15″N 89°0′29″W (night)

Links
- Public license information: Public file; LMS
- Webcast: Listen live
- Website: mywithersradio.com/wmix

WMIX (940 kHz) is a commercial radio station licensed to Mount Vernon, Illinois, United States. Owned by Withers Broadcasting, WMIX airs a soft oldies and adult standards format, with programming coming from Westwood One's "America's Best Music" service. It also broadcasts live football and basketball games from Mt. Vernon Township High School. The studios and offices are located on Withers Drive.

WMIX is also heard on two FM translators, at 96.5 MHz in Mt. Vernon and 93.7 in Fairfield.

== History ==
The station signed on the air in 1946. It originally was a daytimer, required to go off the air at night. In the 1960s and 70s, it aired a middle of the road (MOR) format, playing popular adult artists with news and sports. It was a network affiliate of the Mutual Broadcasting System.

The station was assigned the call sign "WMIX" by the Federal Communications Commission (FCC). Withers Broadcasting registered the "WMIX" branding as a registered trademark, which prevents other stations, many of them carrying some sort of Mix FM format, from using WMIX as a branding without permission.

In the early 2000s, WMIX broadcast a talk radio format, branded "News Talk 940," plus adult standards music in the evening and overnight. Syndicated talk programming included The Rush Limbaugh Show, The Jim Bohannon Show, plus adult standards music blocks hosted by Chick Watkins, Jeff Rollins and Don K. Reid from Dial Global's "America's Best Music" radio network. The station later decided to end the news/talk programming, instead airing "America's Best Music" around the clock.

== Translators ==
WMIX programming is also carried on two broadcast translator stations to extend or improve the coverage area of the station.

Call sign	Frequency	City of license	FID	ERP (W)	Class	FCC info
W229AU	93.7 FM	Fairfield, Illinois		250	D	
W243AV	96.5 FM	Mount Vernon, Illinois	146841	210	D	LMS
