= WDML =

- Woodlawn, Illinois; United States
- Broadcast area: Mount Vernon; Centralia
- Frequency: 106.9 MHz
- Branding: 106.9 FM

Programming
- Format: Classic rock

Ownership
- Owner: Withers Broadcasting; (WDML, LLC)

History
- First air date: November 5, 1993

Technical information
- Licensing authority: FCC
- Facility ID: 70468
- Class: A
- ERP: 3,000 watts
- HAAT: 100 meters (330 ft)
- Transmitter coordinates: 38°21′28.0″N 89°05′55.0″W

Links
- Public license information: Public file; LMS
- Webcast: Listen Live
- Website: www.wdml.com

WDML (106.9 FM, "Adult Rock & Roll") is a radio station broadcasting a classic rock format. Licensed to Woodlawn, Illinois, United States, and broadcasting in the Mount Vernon area, the station is owned by Dana Withers' Withers Broadcasting, through licensee WDML, LLC. The station is an affiliate of the syndicated Sammy Hagar program "Sammy Hagar's Top Rock Countdown" and Pink Floyd program "Floydian Slip."
