= KREG-TV =

Television station in Glenwood Springs, Colorado

- Glenwood Springs–Denver, Colorado; United States
- City: Glenwood Springs, Colorado
- Channels: Digital: 23 (UHF); Virtual: 3
- Branding: MeTV Denver

Programming
- Affiliations: 3.1: MeTV; for others, see § Subchannels

Ownership
- Owner: Weigel Broadcasting; (KREG-TV LLC)

History
- First air date: January 28, 1984
- Former call signs: KCWS (1984–1987)
- Former channel numbers: Analog: 3 (VHF, 1984–2009); Virtual: 3 (until 2018), 32 (2018–2020)
- Former affiliations: Independent (January−July 1984); Dark (July 1984–1987, January–July 2017); CBS (via KREX-TV, 1987–January 2017); NBC (secondary, 1987–1996); Fox (secondary, early 1990s–1997); Heroes & Icons (July 2017–2020; now on 3.2)
- Call sign meaning: KREX Glenwood Springs (former satellite of KREX-TV)

Technical information
- Licensing authority: FCC
- Facility ID: 70578
- ERP: 16.1 kW
- HAAT: 774 m (2,539 ft)
- Transmitter coordinates: 39°25′7″N 107°22′8″W
- Translator(s): KCNC-TV 4.4 Denver

Links
- Public license information: Public file; LMS
- Website: metv.com/kreg

KREG-TV (channel 3) is a television station in Glenwood Springs, Colorado, United States, broadcasting the classic television network MeTV. It is owned by Weigel Broadcasting, and has a transmitter atop Sunlight Peak.

The station went on the air in 1984 as KCWS, a local independent station for the Colorado Western Slope, but went bankrupt and off the air after six months. It was revived in 1987 as KREG-TV, a satellite of CBS and NBC affiliate KREX-TV in Grand Junction. As Glenwood Springs is assigned to the Denver media market instead of Grand Junction, the station was sold by Nexstar Broadcasting Group to Marquee Broadcasting in 2016, and to Weigel Broadcasting in 2020. Since then, even though KREG-TV has no signal penetration into the Denver metropolitan area, it has been positioned as a station serving Denver via cable and satellite.

== History ==
=== KCWS ===
KREG-TV was launched January 28, 1984, by Western Slope Communications, a group of investors, as independent station KCWS on VHF channel 3. It promised the best selection of off-network and first-run syndicated programming available; plus an aggressive regional news operation that pioneered the first long-form morning newscast on Western Slope television.

At its launch, KCWS stated it had "one of the highest shares ever received by an independent station at sign-on". However, the station's construction was hindered by what it said was "one of the worst winters in Colorado history", as well as equipment that was either delayed or damaged; in addition, the station fought with commissioners in Garfield County to locate its transmitter at the Sunlight Peak transmitter site used by its translator system. Mesa County's commissioners refused to allow KCWS to be carried on its translators; this prevented the station from being seen in Grand Junction, the largest community in the Western Slope, until the station was added to United Cable's lineup. In addition, the small size of the Glenwood Springs area meant that advertising dollars were scarce; it did not help matters that KWGN-TV in Denver had been available on cable for decades in the area. The station underwent three rounds of layoffs, and filed for Chapter 11 bankruptcy on June 27, 1984. News was eventually eliminated, and after five months, KCWS went dark on July 2, 1984, following a Taxi rerun.

=== Satellite of KREX-TV ===
In 1987, W. Russell Withers Jr., owner of KREX-TV, the CBS and NBC affiliate in Grand Junction, bought KCWS; it returned to the air September 16, 1987, as KREG-TV, a satellite of KREX. As a satellite of KREX, KREG had no local news inserts but did have a small office in Carbondale, near Glenwood Springs.

Withers sold KREG-TV, along with KREX-TV, to Hoak Media in 2003. On December 19, 2013, Gray Television, who a month earlier announced its purchase of Hoak Media, sold KREG and its sister stations in Grand Junction (as part of Gray's divestment to comply with FCC rules because it was the owner of KKCO and operator of KJCT in the Grand Junction market) to Nexstar Broadcasting Group for $33.5 million. The sale was completed on June 13, 2014.

=== Sale to Marquee Broadcasting ===
On May 10, 2016, Nexstar agreed to sell KREG-TV to Marquee Broadcasting for $350,000; the sale is part of a series of divestitures required following Nexstar's acquisition of Media General due to Federal Communications Commission (FCC) ownership caps. Following the sale, KREG, which is considered to be part of the Denver market, ceased to be a satellite of KREX. KREG went dark on January 5, 2017, saying that ice and snow accumulation and the risk of avalanches had rendered the station's transmitter inaccessible, preventing repairs. On July 1, 2017, KREG-TV returned to the air broadcasting Heroes & Icons programming.

=== Sale to Weigel Broadcasting ===
Marquee Broadcasting agreed to sell KREG-TV to Weigel Broadcasting for $2 million on May 30, 2019. The sale was completed on January 2, 2020, making KREG an H&I owned-and-operated station. Later in 2020, MeTV was added on 3.1, pushing Heroes & Icons to 3.2.

== Subchannels ==
The station's signal is multiplexed:

Subchannels of KREG-TV
Channel	Res.	Short name	Programming
3.1	720p	KREG-HD	MeTV
3.2	480i	H&I	Heroes & Icons
3.3	480i	StartTV	Start TV
3.4	480i	Decades	Catchy Comedy
3.5	480i	Movies!	Movies!
3.6	480i	MeTV+	MeTV+
3.7	480i	Story	Story Television
3.8	480i	TOONS	MeTV Toons
3.9	480i	WEST	WEST

Because KREG-TV has no signal penetration into the Denver metropolitan area, five of the nine affiliations are also seen on subchannels of Denver's television stations. This includes KCNC-TV with Start TV (4.2), MeTV (4.4), Catchy Comedy (4.5), and Story Television (4.6), and KTVD with Heroes & Icons (20.2).
