= WEBQ-FM =

- Eldorado, Illinois; United States
- Broadcast area: Harrisburg, Illinois; Eldorado, Illinois
- Frequency: 102.3 MHz
- Branding: 102.3 Lite FM

Programming
- Format: Soft adult contemporary
- Affiliations: St. Louis Cardinals Radio Network

Ownership
- Owner: Withers Broadcasting; (WEBQ, LLC)
- Sister stations: WEBQ; WISH-FM

History
- First air date: 1975
- Former call signs: WKSI (1974–1985); WDRQ (1985–1989

Technical information
- Licensing authority: FCC
- Facility ID: 70349
- Class: A
- ERP: 3,000 watts
- HAAT: 91 meters (299 ft)
- Transmitter coordinates: 37°43′3.2″N 88°32′37.2″W

Links
- Public license information: Public file; LMS
- Webcast: Listen live
- Website: www.1023litefm.com

WEBQ-FM (102.3 MHz) is a radio station licensed to Eldorado, Illinois, United States. The station airs a soft adult contemporary format, and is owned by Dana Withers' Withers Broadcasting, through licensee WEBQ, LLC.

On January 1, 2023, WEBQ-FM rebranded as "102.3 Lite FM".
