= WDHS =

Television station in Iron Mountain, Michigan (1989–2015)

Iron Mountain–Marquette, Michigan; United States
- City: Iron Mountain, Michigan
- Channels: Digital: 8 (VHF); Virtual: 8

Programming
- Affiliations: TBN (1990s); EWTN (2006)

Ownership
- Owner: Withers Broadcasting Companies; (Estate of W. Russell Withers, Jr., Dana R. Withers, Executor)

History
- First air date: July 31, 1989
- Last air date: November 19, 2015; (26 years, 111 days); (license canceled)
- Former call signs: WIIM-TV (1986–1992)
- Former channel number(s): Analog: 8 (VHF, 1989–2009); Digital: 22 (UHF, 2000–2009)
- Call sign meaning: "Deliverance, Healing, Salvation" (station formerly broadcast religious programming)

Technical information
- Licensing authority: FCC
- Facility ID: 15498
- ERP: 22 kW
- HAAT: 171 m (561 ft)
- Transmitter coordinates: 45°49′10″N 88°2′35″W

Links
- Public license information: Public file; LMS

WDHS (channel 8) was a television station licensed to Iron Mountain, Michigan, United States, which served the Central and Western Upper Peninsula of Michigan. The station was owned by Withers Broadcasting Companies. WDHS' transmitter was located on East B Street in Iron Mountain.

The station was dark for much of its history; it came on the air only for a short period on an annual basis merely as a way to keep its Federal Communications Commission (FCC) license active. The WDHS license was canceled on November 19, 2015, months after an FCC policy change negated the "once per year broadcast" method of retaining a station license which had been exploited in the radio industry to "warehouse" prominent call letters in small markets, along with television broadcasters holding out for sales partners.

When WDHS was on the air, it theoretically could serve parts of Baraga, Delta, Dickinson, Gogebic, Houghton, Iron, Marquette and Menominee counties in Michigan, and Florence, Forest, Langlade, Marinette, Oconto, Oneida and Vilas counties in Wisconsin. Most likely, it only broadcast at a low power to save electricity and fulfill the legal fiction of maintaining the license.
