= KYRX =

Radio station in Marble Hill, Missouri

Coordinates: 37°22′49″N 90°04′49″W

- Marble Hill, Missouri; United States
- Broadcast area: Cape Girardeau, Missouri
- Frequency: 97.3 MHz
- Branding: Fox Sports 97.3

Programming
- Format: Sports
- Affiliations: Fox Sports Radio

Ownership
- Owner: Withers Broadcasting; (Withers Broadcasting Company of Missouri, LLC)
- Sister stations: KAPE, KGMO, KJXX, KREZ

History
- First air date: 1999

Technical information
- Licensing authority: FCC
- Facility ID: 81680
- Class: A
- ERP: 3,600 watts
- HAAT: 130 meters (430 ft)

Links
- Public license information: Public file; LMS
- Webcast: Listen Live
- Website: foxsports973.com/

KYRX (97.3 FM) is a radio station licensed to Marble Hill, Missouri in the United States. The station broadcasts a sports format and is owned by Withers Broadcasting, through licensee Withers Broadcasting Company of Missouri, LLC.

On August 3, 2022, KYRX changed its format from classic country to sports, branded as "Fox Sports 97.3".
