= KGMO =

- Cape Girardeau, Missouri; United States
- Broadcast area: Southeast Missouri; Southern Illinois; Western Kentucky
- Frequency: 100.7 MHz
- Branding: 100.7 KGMO

Programming
- Format: Classic rock
- Affiliations: United Stations Radio Networks

Ownership
- Owner: Withers Broadcasting; (Withers Broadcasting Company of Missouri, LLC)
- Sister stations: KAPE, KJXX, KREZ, KYRX

History
- First air date: 1969
- Former call signs: KGMO-FM (1980–1981)
- Call sign meaning: Kape Girardeau MissOuri

Technical information
- Facility ID: 70577
- Class: C
- ERP: 100,000 watts
- HAAT: 302 meters
- Transmitter coordinates: 37°22′16″N 89°31′52″W

Links
- Webcast: Listen Live
- Website: kgmo.com

KGMO (100.7 FM) is a radio station broadcasting from Cape Girardeau, Missouri, and reaching portions of southern Illinois, Southeast Missouri, northeast Arkansas, the Missouri Bootheel, Western Kentucky, and the northern portion of West Tennessee with its 100,000-watt signal.

Its current format is classic rock, although it has had an oldies format in the past. At one time, KGMO had an AM sister station, KGMO (AM). The AM station was where (politically) conservative radio & TV personality Rush Limbaugh got his first job as a disc jockey, in his hometown, but was fired after six months. That station is now KAPE, which is affiliated with a majority of the Fox News and Fox Sports Radio programming.
