= WZZL =

- Reidland, Kentucky; United States
- Broadcast area: Paducah, Kentucky
- Frequency: 106.7 MHz
- Branding: 106.7 WZZL

Programming
- Format: Mainstream rock
- Affiliations: Compass Media Networks

Ownership
- Owner: Withers Broadcasting; (Withers Broadcasting Company of Paducah, LLC)
- Sister stations: WMOK, WREZ

History
- First air date: 1992
- Former call signs: WSEQ (1991–1992)

Technical information
- Licensing authority: FCC
- Facility ID: 73276
- Class: A
- ERP: 4,700 watts
- HAAT: 113 meters (371 feet)
- Transmitter coordinates: 37°05′55″N 88°37′19″W

Links
- Public license information: Public file; LMS
- Webcast: Listen Live
- Website: wzzl.com

WZZL (106.7 FM) is a radio station licensed to the community of Reidland, Kentucky, and serves the greater Paducah, Kentucky, area. The station is owned by Withers Broadcasting and licensed to Withers Broadcasting Company of Paducah, LLC.

== History ==
The station was assigned the WZZL call letters by the Federal Communications Commission on November 1, 1992.

== Programming ==
WZZL has been airing a mainstream rock format since inception. It opened in 1992 by playing "In the Air Tonight" by Phil Collins for 24 hours.

The station also carried the syndicated The Bob & Tom Show weekday mornings, until January 2016. On January 11 WZZL began airing The Free Beer and Hot Wings Show weekday mornings from 4 a.m. to 9 a.m.

In January 2017, WZZL switched slogans from "'ZZL Rocks" to "Everything That Rocks", as they were increasing their classic rock and classic alternative selections, to better compete with WJLI and sister station KGMO. To further showcase the move towards classic rock, their television commercial featured only classic rock artists and songs.

== Current line-up ==
As of March 2021 the on-air line-up for WZZL is as follows:

=== Weekdays ===
- The Free Beer and Hot Wings Show 4a-9a
- Cash 9a-2p
- Chris 2p-7p
- Leah 7p-12a

=== Weekends ===
- The Free Beer and Hot Wings Show (Best Of) 4a-9a
- The remainder of the weekend runs with rotating Air Personalities.
