= KREZ (FM) =

- Chaffee, Missouri; United States
- Broadcast area: Cape Girardeau, Missouri; Sikeston, Missouri
- Frequency: 104.7 MHz
- Branding: 104.7 The Bridge

Programming
- Format: Soft adult contemporary
- Affiliations: Compass Media Networks; Premiere Networks

Ownership
- Owner: Withers Broadcasting; (Withers Broadcasting Company of Missouri, LLC)
- Sister stations: KAPE; KGMO; KJXX; KYRX

History
- First air date: July 1, 1990 (as KYRX)
- Former call signs: KZRX (1989–1990, CP); KYRX (1990–2002)

Technical information
- Licensing authority: FCC
- Facility ID: 10658
- Class: C3
- ERP: 7,700 watts
- HAAT: 178.4 meters (585 ft)
- Transmitter coordinates: 37°09′47″N 89°28′59″W

Links
- Public license information: Public file; LMS
- Webcast: Listen live
- Website: www.1047thebridge.com

KREZ (104.7 MHz) is an FM radio station airing a soft adult contemporary format. The station is licensed to Chaffee, Missouri, and serves the areas of Cape Girardeau and Sikeston, Missouri. KREZ is owned by Withers Broadcasting, through licensee Withers Broadcasting Company of Missouri, LLC.

== History ==
KREZ signed on July 1, 1990, as KYRX.
