= WMOK =

- Metropolis, Illinois; United States
- Broadcast area: Southern Illinois / Paducah, Kentucky
- Frequency: 920 kHz
- Branding: 920 WMOK

Programming
- Format: Country music

Ownership
- Owner: Withers Broadcasting; (Withers Broadcasting Company of Paducah, LLC)
- Sister stations: WREZ, WZZL

History
- First air date: February 4, 1951

Technical information
- Licensing authority: FCC
- Class: B
- Power: 1000 watts (day); 750 watts (night)
- Transmitter coordinates: 37°9′12″N 88°42′33″W (day); 37°8′56″N 88°38′10″W (night)
- Translator: 93.7 W229DI (Metropolis)

Links
- Public license information: Public file; LMS
- Website: 920wmok.com

WMOK Metropolis AM is a radio station broadcasting a country music format - airing on 920AM and 93.7FM. Licensed to Metropolis, Illinois, the station serves Southern Illinois, and the Paducah, Kentucky area. WMOK is owned by Withers Broadcasting, which purchased the station in 1997.

== History ==
The station began broadcasting on February 4, 1951, and originally ran 500 watts during daytime hours only. The station's power was increased to 1,000 watts in 1954. By 1989, the station had added nighttime operations, running 73 watts. In 2008, the station's nighttime power was increased to 750 watts. The station has long aired a country music format.
