= KAPE =

- Cape Girardeau, Missouri; United States
- Frequency: 1550 kHz
- Branding: KAPE Radio

Programming
- Language: English
- Format: News/Talk
- Affiliations: Fox News Radio; Compass Media Networks; Premiere Networks; Radio America; Salem Radio Network; Westwood One; Motor Racing Network

Ownership
- Owner: Withers Broadcasting; (Withers Broadcasting Company of Missouri, LLC)
- Sister stations: KGMO, KJXX, KREZ, KYRX

History
- First air date: 1951
- Former call signs: KGMO (1951–1986); KEWI (1986); KKPE (1986–1987)
- Call sign meaning: KAPE (as in Cape Girardeau)

Technical information
- Licensing authority: FCC
- Facility ID: 70594
- Class: D
- Power: 5,000 watts day 48 watts night
- Transmitter coordinates: 37°16′46.2″N 89°33′35.3″W
- Translator: 95.7 K239CQ (Cape Girardeau)

Links
- Public license information: Public file; LMS
- Webcast: Listen Live
- Website: www.kaperadio957.com

KAPE (1550 AM, "KAPE Radio") is an American radio station licensed to serve the community of Cape Girardeau, Missouri. The station is owned by Withers Broadcasting and the broadcast license is held by Withers Broadcasting Company of Missouri, LLC.

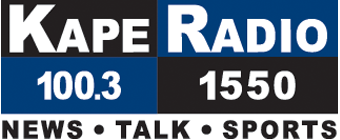
Former logo when simulcasting on 100.3

The station was assigned the call sign "KAPE" by the U.S. Federal Communications Commission (FCC) on March 2, 1987. It was licensed as "KGMO" when it signed on in 1951, and was assigned "KEWI" on April 14, 1986, and "KKPE" on May 1, 1986.

== Programming ==
KAPE broadcasts a news/talk format. The station features programming from Fox News Radio and Salem Media Group. As of August 2022, syndicated programming includes weekday talk shows hosted by Dana Loesch, Dave Ramsey, Glenn Beck, Hugh Hewitt, Joe Pags, John Gibson, and Todd Schnitt.

Legendary radio broadcaster Rush Limbaugh started his career at KGMO in 1967.

== Translator ==
KAPE programming is also carried on a broadcast translator station to extend or improve the coverage area of the station.

Broadcast translator for KAPE
Call sign	Frequency	City of license	FID	ERP (W)	Class	FCC info
K239CQ	(95.7 FM) FM	Cape Girardeau, Missouri	201017	250	D	LMS
