= KREX-TV =

Television station in Grand Junction, Colorado

- Grand Junction, Colorado; United States
- Channels: Digital: 2 (VHF); Virtual: 5
- Branding: KREX

Programming
- Affiliations: 5.1: CBS; 5.2: CW+; 5.3: Independent with MyNetworkTV; 5.4: Bounce TV

Ownership
- Owner: Nexstar Media Group; (Nexstar Media Inc.)
- Sister stations: KFQX, KGJT-CD

History
- First air date: May 30, 1954
- Former call signs: KFXJ-TV (1954–1956)
- Former channel numbers: Analog: 5 (VHF, 1954–2009)
- Former affiliations: All secondary: DuMont (1954–1955); ABC (1954–1979); NBC (1954–1996); NTA (1956–1961)
- Call sign meaning: Rex Howell (founder); Latin word for "king"

Technical information
- Licensing authority: FCC
- Facility ID: 70596
- ERP: 0.8 kW
- HAAT: −36 m (−118 ft)
- Transmitter coordinates: 39°5′17″N 108°34′0″W
- Translator(s): see § Translators

Links
- Public license information: Public file; LMS
- Website: www.westernslopenow.com

KREX-TV (channel 5) is a television station in Grand Junction, Colorado, United States, serving Colorado's Western Slope region as an affiliate of CBS and The CW Plus. It is owned by Nexstar Media Group alongside KGJT-CD, an independent station with MyNetworkTV, and is co-managed with KFQX (channel 4), a Fox affiliate. The three stations share studios on Hillcrest Avenue in Grand Junction, where KREX-TV's transmitter is also located.

This station began broadcasting programming on May 30, 1954, as KFXJ-TV before becoming KREX-TV in 1956. Owned by Rex Howell, who had brought radio to the area by relocating KFXJ radio to Grand Junction in 1930, it was the only television station on the Western Slope for 25 years; though it aired programming from all major networks, its primary affiliation was CBS. The establishment of satellite stations KREY-TV in Montrose (1956) and KREZ-TV in Durango (1965) extended the station's reach. ABC programs moved to KJCT (channel 8) in 1979, but KREX-TV continued as an affiliate of CBS and NBC until KKCO (channel 11) began in 1996. Aside from a period between 1966 and 1970, Howell was the primary owner of KREX-TV until his death in 1978.

Withers Broadcasting acquired KREX-TV in 1985; it added a third satellite, KREG-TV in Glenwood Springs, in 1987 but sold off KREZ-TV in 1995. Under Withers, KREX acquired the franchise to broadcast Fox programming to the Western Slope, which became KFQX. Hoak Media bought the station in 2003. Its studios burned to the ground in a 2008 fire; after reporting for the station's website and later using facilities at Western Colorado Community College, the facility was rebuilt in 2009. Nexstar acquired the station in 2014 after most of Hoak was bought by Gray Television, owner of KKCO.

== History ==
On March 25, 1953, the Federal Communications Commission (FCC) granted Western Slope Broadcasting Company—owned by Rex Howell, owner of Grand Junction radio station KFXJ—a construction permit to build a new television station on channel 5. Howell, who had brought radio to Grand Junction when KFXJ moved from the Denver suburb of Edgewater to Grand Junction in 1930, was getting into television earlier than he had anticipated. He told the Grand Junction Rotary Club shortly after the permit was authorized that he would rather have waited five years to build a TV station but felt it necessary to "move now". To house the station, KFXJ's radio studios were expanded with a new television wing. KFXJ-TV began broadcasting a test pattern on May 22 and regular programming on May 30, 1954. It held affiliations at its start with NBC and the DuMont Television Network. CBS affiliated with the station in December 1954 as part of its Extended Market Plan, which provided CBS programs to small-market stations.

Shortly after going on the air, in August 1955, Howell announced plans to build satellite stations for KFXJ-TV to expand its coverage to Montrose (65 miles (105 km) south of Grand Junction) on channel 10 and Durango (130 miles (210 km) south of Grand Junction) on channel 6. The Grand Junction KFXJ stations became KREX and KREX-TV on May 1, 1956, with the KFXJ-TV call sign moved to the new Montrose station, which became KREY-TV on July 21, 1958. Later that year, KREX-TV obtained a live hookup to CBS; other networks were not included. To broadcast the 1958 World Series from NBC live, the station had to set up a portable microwave transmission antenna at a home in Price, Utah, that could receive the network signal from Salt Lake City so it could be beamed back to Grand Junction. In 1961, the station announced plans to obtain a permanent microwave link for NBC and ABC programs; by that time, KREX-TV was a primary CBS affiliate, and that network accounted for 80 percent of its national programming. The microwave link began use in 1966 and allowed the station to air more sports telecasts from NBC and ABC.

The Durango channel was not originally built by Howell and instead went on the air as a separate station, KJFL-TV. That station burned to the ground in a February 1964 fire; an affiliated company of KREX purchased the construction permit and put the station back on the air as KREZ-TV. The combination of KREX-TV, KREY-TV, and KREZ-TV was promoted as the XYZ network. Further, "Rex" and "rey" meant "king" in Latin and Spanish, respectively.

In 1966, Howell sold KREX-TV and its satellites for $2.092 million to XYZ Television, Inc., in which an 81-percent controlling stake was held by Cincinnati-based Forestville Realty Corporation including James and William Williams. The buyers struggled to make payments on the transaction, and in 1970 Howell reassumed managerial control over the XYZ stations. Howell—who also served as a state senator and was known as a pilot and for his activity in the community—died in 1978. The Williams brothers and other out-of-state interests continued to hold minority shares in the stations.

From the 1950s to 1979, KREX-TV was the only television station in Grand Junction and maintained affiliations with all three major networks: CBS, NBC, and ABC. The XYZ stations thus aired most of television's top programs. A second Grand Junction station, KJCT (channel 8), arrived on October 22, 1979. It was built by Pikes Peak Broadcasting, owners of KRDO-TV in Colorado Springs, and was an ABC affiliate. KREX-TV continued as an affiliate of CBS and NBC with a primary emphasis on CBS. In 1981, when CBS extended its national morning program Morning from 60 to 90 minutes, KREX-TV ceased carrying Today from NBC. KREX-TV tended to schedule selected NBC prime time programs for air in the 6 p.m. hour. A Mesa County–operated system of translators and the local cable system provided Denver's NBC affiliate, KCNC-TV, to Grand Junction viewers. During the 1988 Summer Olympics, which aired on NBC, KREX-TV temporarily dropped most CBS programs to show the Olympics.

=== Withers Broadcasting ownership ===
Howell's death prompted a number of inquiries as to the KREX stations from potential buyers, and under FCC rules of the time, any sale would have to separate KREX radio and television. In 1984, the stock of XYZ, Inc., was redistributed to separate the radio and television entities. Russell Withers of Mount Vernon, Illinois, entered into negotiations to acquire XYZ Television in 1983 and agreed to buy the television stations in May 1985. Under Withers, KREX began telecasting Fox programming in Grand Junction on low-power channel 27 on September 1, 1994; Withers Broadcasting had obtained the primary affiliation the previous May for a planned full-service station, KJWA, and Fox began full-power telecasting in Grand Junction as KFQX (channel 4) in 2000, supplanting channel 27. In 1996, Grand Junction gained a full-time NBC affiliate when KKCO began broadcasting on channel 11.

Under Withers, two changes were made to KREX-TV's lineup of satellite stations. The bankrupt KCWS-TV (channel 3) in Glenwood Springs, which had operated in early 1984 prior to leaving the air for financial reasons, was purchased in 1986. It returned to the air as KREG-TV, a satellite for the Roaring Fork Valley, in 1987. KREZ-TV in Durango was sold to Lee Enterprises in 1994 and switched to broadcasting KRQE, the CBS affiliate in Albuquerque, New Mexico.

In 2003, Withers sold KREX-TV and its satellites to Hoak Media as part of his estate planning. The acquisition marked a return to TV station ownership for Hoak, the former owner of Heritage Media. When Hoak acquired KREX, it was in need of investment and updates. The transmitter on Black Ridge, west of Grand Junction, was operating at half power due to lightning damage and neglect; Hoak improved it to about 80 percent by December 2004. KREX and KFQX began digital and high definition broadcasts on November 10, 2006.

=== 2008 studio fire ===
On the morning of January 20, 2008, the KREX studios on Hillcrest Manor were destroyed in a fire, the worst in monetary damage in Grand Junction history with damages approaching $6 million. A visitor from Texas, driving to church on the Sunday morning, pounded on the station doors and alerted the five employees inside to the developing fire. The station facilities lacked sprinklers and had a mazelike layout owing to multiple remodels and additions. While forensic investigators were not able to conclusively determine the cause of the blaze, they concluded that the heat was originally centered around a defective space heater.

With KREX and KFQX out of service, CBS and Fox programming was outright unavailable to over-the-air viewers and Dish Network customers for days. Bresnan Communications, owner of the Grand Junction cable system, brought in the Denver affiliates to continue network service to customers. The digital equipment and transmitter, located in a former bomb shelter with 12-inch (30 cm)-thick concrete walls, was saved from the fire. A temporary trailer was installed on site. By February 1, the transmitters were in service and broadcasting color bars and tone, in time for KREX and KFQX to telecast Fox's coverage of Super Bowl XLII and other network programs. Syndicated programming and commercials followed a week later, enabling the station to make money on advertising.

Some newsgathering equipment was recovered from the burning building, including field cameras, tripods, and microphones. To restore news coverage, KJCT, KKCO, and Rocky Mountain PBS offered the use of their space. The station's reporters continued to file stories for the KREX website, and the news department resumed newscasts on March 3 from the Rocky Mountain PBS studio at Western Colorado Community College, using all-digital equipment. New studios were built on the original site beginning in late 2008; the site was subdivided, as the new station would be smaller and use less space than the original building. The move to the new studios took place in August 2009 and involved temporary outages in transmission and a three-day suspension of newscasts.

=== Sale to Nexstar ===
On November 20, 2013, Gray Television announced it would purchase Hoak Media and KFQX owner Parker Broadcasting in a $335 million deal. Since Gray already owned KKCO and operated KJCT (which was owned by Excalibur Broadcasting), it decided to spin off KREX and its translators, and KFQX to a third-party. On December 19, Gray announced, in a side deal related to the Hoak acquisition, that KREX and its satellites would be sold to Nexstar Broadcasting Group, while KFQX would be sold to Mission Broadcasting, for $37.5 million. The sale of KREX was completed on June 13, 2014, while the KFQX sale was finalized on March 31, 2017. For ownership cap compliance reasons, Nexstar sold KREG to Marquee Broadcasting at the same time it merged with Media General.

== News operation ==
In the early days, KREX-TV news was a one-man operation. News director Bill Cleary recounted that he was the news anchor and presented the weather and sports, with the occasional aid of photos he had taken of news events. When KJCT came on the air in 1979, it provided the first local news competition to KREX. It initially was a distant second but pulled into a more competitive position, particularly for the 10 p.m. news; KREX retained viewers at 5:30 p.m., when its local newscast followed the CBS Evening News. The XYZ network afforded opportunities for local news inserts. In the early 1960s, the network experimented with local news segments at its satellite stations, but they were delivered by local salesmen and rarely contained hard news items. The station tried again in the 1980s, introducing five-minute news segments in Montrose, Durango, and—after 1987—Glenwood Springs.

By the time Hoak acquired KREX in 2004, the news department had slipped to third in the ratings, behind KJCT and KKCO. The company invested in new news sets to upgrade the quality of the station's newscasts and improve ratings. By 2013, KREX was third in early evening news and second in late news.

== Technical information ==
=== Subchannels ===
The KREX-TV transmitter is located at its studios on Hillcrest Drive. The station's signal is multiplexed:

Subchannels of KREX-TV
Subchannel	Res.	Short name	Programming
5.1	1080i	KREX	CBS
5.2	720p	CW+	The CW Plus
5.3	480i	KGJT	KGJT-CD (Independent with MyNetworkTV) (4:3)
5.4	480i	BOUNCE	Bounce TV (4:3)

Simulcast of subchannels of another station

=== Translators ===
KREX-TV's signal is rebroadcast over the following translators in western Colorado:

- Basalt: K35IX-D
- Collbran: K24LQ-D
- Mesa: K10RB-D
- Redstone: K21OV-D
- Snowmass Village: K35PE-D
- Thomasville: K07KF-D
