= Chaffee, Missouri =

- City
- Location of Chaffee, Missouri
- Coordinates: 37°10′52″N 89°39′41″W
- Country: United States
- State: Missouri
- County: Scott

Area
  - Total: 1.85 sq mi (4.79 km^{2})
  - Land: 1.80 sq mi (4.65 km^{2})
  - Water: 0.054 sq mi (0.14 km^{2})
- Elevation: 341 ft (104 m)

Population (2020)
  - Total: 3,057
  - Density: 1,703/sq mi (657.6/km^{2})
- Time zone: UTC-6 (Central (CST))
  - Summer (DST): UTC-5 (CDT)
- ZIP code: 63740
- Area code: 573
- FIPS code: 29-12988
- GNIS feature ID: 2393794
- Website: cityofchaffee.com/chf_wp/

Chaffee is a city in Scott County, Missouri, United States. The population was 3,057 at the 2020 census.

== History ==
Chaffee was platted in 1905, and named after Adna Chaffee, an officer in the Spanish–American War. A post office called Chaffee has been in operation since 1905.

== Geography ==
According to the United States Census Bureau, the city has a total area of 1.85 square miles (4.79 km^{2}), of which 1.80 square miles (4.66 km^{2}) is land and 0.05 square miles (0.13 km^{2}) is water.

== Demographics ==
Historical population
Census	Pop.	Note	%±
1910	2,082		—
1920	3,035		45.8%
1930	2,902		−4.4%
1940	3,049		5.1%
1950	3,134		2.8%
1960	2,862		−8.7%
1970	2,793		−2.4%
1980	3,241		16.0%
1990	3,059		−5.6%
2000	3,044		−0.5%
2010	2,955		−2.9%
2020	3,057		3.5%
U.S. Decennial Census

=== 2020 census ===
As of the 2020 census, Chaffee had a population of 3,057. The median age was 36.9 years. 26.0% of residents were under the age of 18 and 18.6% of residents were 65 years of age or older. For every 100 females there were 90.6 males, and for every 100 females age 18 and over there were 83.5 males age 18 and over.

0.0% of residents lived in urban areas, while 100.0% lived in rural areas.

There were 1,252 households in Chaffee, of which 33.2% had children under the age of 18 living in them. Of all households, 38.4% were married-couple households, 19.0% were households with a male householder and no spouse or partner present, and 33.2% were households with a female householder and no spouse or partner present. About 32.7% of all households were made up of individuals and 16.1% had someone living alone who was 65 years of age or older.

There were 1,375 housing units, of which 8.9% were vacant. The homeowner vacancy rate was 3.1% and the rental vacancy rate was 4.1%.

Racial composition as of the 2020 census
Race	Number	Percent
White	2,820	92.2%
Black or African American	27	0.9%
American Indian and Alaska Native	6	0.2%
Asian	9	0.3%
Native Hawaiian and Other Pacific Islander	0	0.0%
Some other race	7	0.2%
Two or more races	188	6.1%
Hispanic or Latino (of any race)	61	2.0%

=== 2010 census ===
As of the census of 2010, there were 2,955 people, 1,204 households, and 762 families living in the city. The population density was 1,641.7 inhabitants per square mile (633.9/km^{2}). There were 1,336 housing units at an average density of 742.2 per square mile (286.6/km^{2}). The racial makeup of the city was 97.83% White, 0.51% Black or African American, 0.20% Native American, 0.10% Asian, 0.07% from other races, and 1.29% from two or more races. Hispanic or Latino people of any race were 1.25% of the population.

There were 1,204 households, of which 34.7% had children under the age of 18 living with them, 45.1% were married couples living together, 12.5% had a female householder with no husband present, 5.7% had a male householder with no wife present, and 36.7% were non-families. 33.0% of all households were made up of individuals, and 16.3% had someone living alone who was 65 years of age or older. The average household size was 2.41 and the average family size was 3.02.

The median age in the city was 36.4 years. 26.1% of residents were under the age of 18; 8.7% were between the ages of 18 and 24; 24.7% were from 25 to 44; 23.8% were from 45 to 64; and 16.8% were 65 years of age or older. The gender makeup of the city was 48.2% male and 51.8% female.

The per capita income for the city was $20,978. About 24.4% of families and 22.4% of the population were below the poverty line, including 35.9% of those under age 18 and 16.5% of those age 65 or over.

=== 2000 census ===
As of the census of 2000, there were 3,044 people, 1,267 households, and 824 families living in the city. The population density was 1,715.8 inhabitants per square mile (662.5/km^{2}). There were 1,378 housing units at an average density of 776.7 per square mile (299.9/km^{2}). The racial makeup of the city was 98.46% White, 0.07% African American, 0.23% Native American, 0.07% Asian, 0.39% from other races, and 0.79% from two or more races. Hispanic or Latino people of any race were 1.18% of the population.

There were 1,267 households, out of which 32.3% had children under the age of 18 living with them, 46.8% were married couples living together, 15.1% had a female householder with no husband present, and 34.9% were non-families. 32.7% of all households were made up of individuals, and 18.4% had someone living alone who was 65 years of age or older. The average household size was 2.36 and the average family size was 2.96.

In the city the population was spread out, with 25.2% under the age of 18, 9.9% from 18 to 24, 25.1% from 25 to 44, 21.4% from 45 to 64, and 18.4% who were 65 years of age or older. The median age was 38 years. For every 100 females there were 85.8 males. For every 100 females age 18 and over, there were 78.6 males.

The median income for a household in the city was $27,076, and the median income for a family was $34,671. Males had a median income of $27,576 versus $18,873 for females. The per capita income for the city was $16,554. About 12.9% of families and 16.2% of the population were below the poverty line, including 21.4% of those under age 18 and 13.7% of those age 65 or over.

== Education ==
It is in the Chaffee R-II School District. Chaffee R-II School District operates one elementary school and Chaffee Jr.-Sr. High School.

The town has a lending library, the Chaffee Public Library.

Three Rivers College's service area includes Scott County.

== Economy ==
For many years, the town's economy was centered on textile manufacturing. Because large amounts of cotton are produced by southeast Missouri farmers, and owing to the town's location near the Mississippi River, it made sense to process the cotton locally. However, in the late 1990s and early 2000s, the town's economy was devastated by factory closings. The Columbia Sportswear factory and the Florsheim Shoe Company announced that they were idling their plants and laying off workers. Nearly 450 jobs were lost in a period of six months. This was compounded by the closure of previous factories such as the Thorngate Clothing Company, which idled its plant in 1996. Out of a population of just 3000 people, this amounted to losing over 60% of the town's employment base.
