= WEBQ (AM) =

Coordinates: 37°43′3.2″N 88°32′37.2″W

- Harrisburg, Illinois; United States
- Broadcast area: Southern Illinois
- Frequency: 1240 kHz
- Branding: Real Country AM 1240

Programming
- Format: Country music

Ownership
- Owner: Withers Broadcasting; (WEBQ, LLC)
- Sister stations: WEBQ-FM; WISH-FM

History
- First air date: November 26, 1924

Technical information
- Licensing authority: FCC
- Facility ID: 70348
- Class: C
- Power: 1,000 watts unlimited
- Translator: 93.7 W229CR (Harrisburg)

Links
- Public license information: Public file; LMS
- Website: www.webqradio.com

WEBQ (1240 AM) is a radio station broadcasting a country music format. Licensed to Harrisburg, Illinois, the station serves Southern Illinois.

== History ==
WEBQ's first license was granted on September 30, 1924, to the Tate Radio Company in Harrisburg, Illinois. The call letters were randomly assigned from a sequential roster of available call signs. It made its debut broadcast on the evening of November 26, 1924.

Following the establishment of the Federal Radio Commission (FRC), stations were initially issued a series of temporary authorizations starting on May 3, 1927. In addition, they were informed that if they wanted to continue operating, they needed to file a formal license application by January 15, 1928, as the first step in determining whether they met the new "public interest, convenience, or necessity" standard. On May 25, 1928, the FRC issued General Order 32, which notified 164 stations, including WEBQ, that "From an examination of your application for future license it does not find that public interest, convenience, or necessity would be served by granting it." However, the station successfully convinced the commission that it should remain licensed.

On November 11, 1928, the FRC implemented a major reallocation of stations under its General Order 40, and WEBQ was assigned to 1210 kHz, sharing time with KFVS in Cape Girardeau, Missouri. In 1940, KFVS moved to 1370 kHz, which allowed WEBQ to have unrestricted hours. In March 1941, WEBQ moved to its current frequency of 1240 kHz, as a result of the implementation of the North American Regional Broadcasting Agreement.
