= KREZ-TV =

Television station in Durango, Colorado

Satellite of KRQE, Albuquerque–Santa Fe, New Mexico
- Durango, Colorado; Farmington, New Mexico; United States
- City: Durango, Colorado
- Channels: Digital: 15 (UHF); Virtual: 6
- Branding: KREZ News 6

Programming
- Affiliations: 6.1: Fox; 6.2: Independent

Ownership
- Owner: Nexstar Media Group; (Nexstar Media Inc.)

History
- First air date: September 15, 1963
- Former call signs: KFJT-TV (CP, 1962–1963); KJFL-TV (1963–1964)
- Former channel numbers: Analog: 6 (VHF, 1963–2009)
- Former affiliations: Independent (1963–1964); Dark (1964–1965); CBS (1965–2026); UPN (secondary, January–October 1995)
- Call sign meaning: Derived from former sister station KREX in Grand Junction

Technical information
- Licensing authority: FCC
- Facility ID: 48589
- ERP: 46 kW
- HAAT: 90.4 m (297 ft)
- Transmitter coordinates: 37°15′46″N 107°54′0.2″W
- Translator(s): see § Translators

Links
- Public license information: Public file; LMS
- Website: www.krqe.com

KREZ-TV (channel 6) is a television station licensed to Durango, Colorado, United States, affiliated with the Fox network. It is a satellite of Albuquerque, New Mexico–based KRQE (channel 13), which is owned by Nexstar Media Group. KREZ-TV's offices are located on Turner Drive in Durango, and its transmitter is located atop Smelter Mountain; its parent station maintains studios on Broadcast Plaza in Albuquerque.

KBIM-TV (channel 10) in Roswell, New Mexico, also serves as a satellite of KRQE. These satellite operations provide additional news bureaus for KRQE and sell advertising time to local sponsors.

== History ==
The station began operations on September 15, 1963, as KJFL-TV, a free-standing local independent station owned by Jeter Telecasting; it went off the air after its facilities were destroyed in a February 1964 fire, and the station was sold, rebuilt and returned to the air on September 9, 1965, as KREZ-TV, a satellite of CBS affiliate KREX-TV (channel 5) in Grand Junction, Colorado. KREZ operated as such for nearly 30 years (with many attempts at regional news along the way) before being sold to Davenport, Iowa-based Lee Enterprises and becoming a satellite of KRQE, the CBS affiliate in Albuquerque, New Mexico, in 1995.

In 1998, Lee Enterprises rebranded the combination of KRQE, KREZ-TV, and KBIM-TV in Roswell, New Mexico, as "CBS Southwest" and revamped the Durango and Roswell stations' news services to produce inserts into KRQE's early evening newscasts. Two years later, Lee would exit broadcasting and sell KRQE, KREZ-TV, KBIM-TV, and most of its other television properties to Emmis Communications; in 2005, Emmis, in its own exit from television, sold its New Mexico outlets to LIN TV Corporation.

A deal to sell KREZ to Native American Broadcasting, LLC was reached in April 2011; upon the sale's completion, KREZ was to become a full-scale independent station (with plans for extensive local programming), and change its call letters to KSWZ-TV. However, the sale was never finalized, and KREZ remained a KRQE satellite.

On March 21, 2014, it was announced that Media General would acquire LIN. The merger was completed on December 19. Just over a year later, on January 27, 2016, it was announced that the Nexstar Broadcasting Group would buy Media General for $4.6 billion. After selling then-Fox affiliate KASA-TV to Ramar Communications, KRQE and its satellites became part of Nexstar Media Group. The sale was completed on January 17, 2017, reuniting KREZ with former parent station KREX.

KREZ lost its CBS affiliation to KOAT-TV on August 1, 2026, as part of a modified renewal of most other Nexstar affiliations with CBS. Albuquerque was one of four markets where stations owned by Hearst Television assumed the CBS affiliation from Nexstar-owned stations in their markets. KREZ became a primary Fox affiliate with the change.

== Technical information ==
=== Subchannels ===
The station's signal is multiplexed:

Subchannels of KREZ-TV
Subchannel	Res.	Short name	Programming
6.1	1080i	KREZ-HD	Fox
6.2	720p	KREZXTR	Independent

=== Analog-to-digital conversion ===
KREZ-TV shut down its analog signal, over VHF channel 6, on June 12, 2009, the official date on which full-power television stations in the United States transitioned from analog to digital broadcasts under federal mandate. The station's digital signal remained on its pre-transition UHF channel 15, using virtual channel 6.

=== Translators ===
- K34QD-D Bayfield & Ignacio
- K31CT-D Cortez
- K31FV-D Durango & Hermosa
- K29HR-D Farmington, NM
- K13XX-D Hesperus
- K23OR-D Pagosa Springs
