= KFQX =

Television station in Grand Junction, Colorado

- Grand Junction, Colorado; United States
- Channels: Digital: 15 (UHF); Virtual: 4
- Branding: Fox 4

Programming
- Affiliations: 4.1: Fox; 4.2: CBS; (for others, see § Subchannels

Ownership
- Owner: Mission Broadcasting, Inc.
- Operator: Nexstar Media Group
- Sister stations: KREX-TV, KGJT-CD

History
- First air date: June 17, 2000
- Former call signs: KJWA (1993–1996)
- Former channel numbers: Analog: 4 (VHF, 2000–2009)
- Call sign meaning: Visually-similar "Q" replacing O in Fox (affiliated network)

Technical information
- Licensing authority: FCC
- Facility ID: 31597
- ERP: 71.5 kW
- HAAT: 407 m (1,335 ft)
- Transmitter coordinates: 39°3′57.5″N 108°44′47.1″W
- Translator(s): see § Translators

Links
- Public license information: Public file; LMS
- Website: www.westernslopenow.com

KFQX (channel 4) is a television station in Grand Junction, Colorado, United States, serving as the Fox affiliate for Colorado's Western Slope region. It is owned by Mission Broadcasting and operated by Nexstar Media Group along with KREX-TV (channel 5), a CBS affiliate, and KGJT-CD (channel 27), an independent station with MyNetworkTV. The three stations share studios on Hillcrest Avenue in downtown Grand Junction; KFQX's transmitter is located at the Black Ridge Electronics Site at the Colorado National Monument west of the city.

KREX obtained the rights to provide Fox programming in Grand Junction in 1994 and began airing the network on a low-power station. KFQX went on the air in 2000 and has been co-managed with KREX for its entire history. KFQX has largely been owned by sidecars to other companies; when Hoak Media owned KREX, Parker Broadcasting owned KFQX, and Mission acquired the station in a deal related to the Nexstar purchase. The station airs Grand Junction newscasts from KREX at 6:30 and 9 p.m. and morning and late evening news from Nexstar-owned KDVR in Denver.

== History ==
KREX-TV first began providing Fox to the Grand Junction area on September 1, 1994, when Withers Broadcasting activated low-power station K27CO. This replaced Foxnet on cable in Grand Junction. Withers Broadcasting had obtained the primary affiliation the previous May for its planned full-service station, KJWA. John Harvey Rees had been granted the construction permit for channel 4 in Grand Junction on November 20, 1992.

KFQX signed on the air in June 2000, replacing K27CO (now KGJT-CD). Parker Broadcasting acquired KFQX in 2004, following the 2003 purchase of KREX by Hoak Media. The station began offering simulcasts of the morning and late newscasts of KDVR, the Fox station in Denver, in 2006; at least one Denver newscast had long been available on cable in Grand Junction, though network duplication issues had left the city without access to a Denver newscast for much of the year. The Denver news simulcasts included Grand Junction-specific weather inserts.

The station was disrupted severely by a fire that destroyed the KREX studios in January 2008. The station was in service within two weeks airing national Fox programming. A new studio facility was opened in August 2009.

On November 20, 2013, Gray Television announced it would purchase Hoak Media and Parker Broadcasting in a $335 million deal. KFQX was to be sold to Excalibur Broadcasting, a company intended to serve as a sidecar for Gray. However, Gray and Excalibur opted to put the Grand Junction stations on the market, with the companies already running KKCO and KJCT. On December 19, Gray announced that KREX and its satellites would be sold to Nexstar Broadcasting Group, while KFQX would be sold to Mission Broadcasting, for $37.5 million. The sale of KREX was completed on June 13, 2014; Nexstar began providing services to KFQX while it awaited FCC approval. The sale was approved on February 27, 2017, and finalized on March 31.

== Technical information ==
=== Subchannels ===
The station's signal is multiplexed:

Subchannels of KFQX and KREY-TV
Subchannel		Res.	Short name	Programming
KFQX	KREY-TV	Res.	Short name	Programming
4.1	10.2	720p	KFQX-HD	Fox
4.2	10.1	480i	KREY-SD	CBS (KREX-TV)
4.3	10.3	480i	Mystery	Ion Mystery (4:3)
4.4	10.4	480i	Grit	Grit (4:3)

Simulcast of subchannels of another station

=== Satellite station ===
KFQX also operates a satellite station in Montrose, Colorado, KREY-TV (channel 10). KREY transmits from Flattop Mesa, a hill northeast of Montrose. Due to its relatively weak signal and the area's very uneven terrain, the station uses six translators to relay its signal to the Uncompahgre Valley and surrounding San Miguel mountain communities. Local studios are located on North 1st Street in Montrose. In its earliest days, local programs including Letters to Santa, in which area children were invited to sit on Santa Claus's lap on live television, were made in cramped quarters at the transmitter building, which doubled as KREY's studio through the 1970s. KREY previously produced short news inserts during KREX's weeknight newscasts, though this has since ended.

Station	City of license	Channels (RF / VC)	First air date	Callsign meaning	ERP	HAAT	Transmitter coordinates	Facility ID	Public license information
KREY-TV	Montrose	13 (VHF); 10	September 18, 1956	Rey is the Spanish word for "king"	2.6 kW	35 m (115 ft)	38°31′2″N 107°51′14″W	70579	Public file LMS

=== Translators ===
- K26MS-D Collbran
- K13ML-D Hotchkiss
- K17NI-D Mesa
- K06HZ-D Paonia
- K03AY-D Ridgway, etc.
- K33QL-D Snowmass Village
- K26PG-D Woody Creek
