= WREZ =

- Metropolis, Illinois; United States
- Broadcast area: Paducah, Kentucky
- Frequency: 105.5 FM
- Branding: 105.5 The CAT

Programming
- Format: Hot adult contemporary

Ownership
- Owner: Withers Broadcasting; (Withers Broadcasting Company of Paducah, LLC)
- Sister stations: WMOK, WZZL

Technical information
- Licensing authority: FCC
- Class: A
- ERP: 6000 watts
- HAAT: 100 metres (328 feet)
- Transmitter coordinates: 37°10′25″N 88°42′29″W

Links
- Public license information: Public file; LMS
- Website: 1055thecat.com

WREZ (105.5 FM, "105.5 The CAT") is a radio station licensed to the community of Metropolis, Illinois, United States, and serving the Paducah, Kentucky, area. The station plays a gold-based hot adult contemporary format. WREZ is owned by Withers Broadcasting.

Notable programming includes the syndicated morning show "The Kidd Kraddick Morning Show", "Backtrax USA" and the "American Top 40 with Ryan Seacrest".
