= KBHI =

- Miner, Missouri; United States
- Frequency: 107.1 MHz
- Branding: Rock 107

Programming
- Format: Active Rock

Ownership
- Owner: Withers Broadcasting; (Withers Broadcasting Company of Southeast Missouri, LLC)

History
- First air date: 2001

Technical information
- Licensing authority: FCC
- Facility ID: 78625
- Class: A
- ERP: 3,700 watts
- HAAT: 128 meters (420 ft)
- Transmitter coordinates: 36°56′33″N 89°41′47″W

Links
- Public license information: Public file; LMS
- Website: Official Website

KBHI (107.1 FM) is a radio station broadcasting a rock music format. Licensed to Miner, Missouri, United States, the station is currently owned by Withers Broadcasting, through licensee Withers Broadcasting Company of Southeast Missouri, LLC.
