= KGJT-CD =

Television station in Grand Junction, Colorado

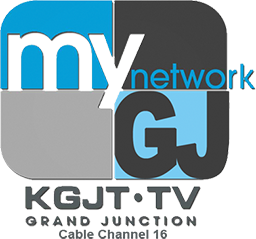
- Grand Junction, Colorado; United States
- Channels: Digital: 27 (UHF); Virtual: 27
- Branding: MyNetworkGJ

Programming
- Affiliations: 27.1: Independent with MyNetworkTV; 27.2: CBS; for others, see § Subchannels

Ownership
- Owner: Nexstar Media Group; (Nexstar Media Inc.)
- Sister stations: KREX-TV, KFQX

History
- Founded: July 9, 1991
- First air date: September 1, 1994
- Former call signs: K27CO (1991–1998); KGJT-LP (1998–2014)
- Former affiliations: Fox (1994–2000); UPN (1995–2006, secondary until 2000); CBS (via KREX, 2008)
- Call sign meaning: Grand Junction; -or-; Grand Junction Television

Technical information
- Licensing authority: FCC
- Facility ID: 71948
- Class: CD
- ERP: 1.94 kW
- HAAT: 913 m (2,995 ft)
- Transmitter coordinates: 39°5′20.9″N 108°13′39.2″W
- Translator(s): KREX-TV 5.3 Grand Junction

Links
- Public license information: Public file; LMS
- Website: www.westernslopenow.com

KGJT-CD (channel 27) is a low-power, Class A television station in Grand Junction, Colorado, United States, serving Colorado's Western Slope region. It is programmed primarily as an independent station, but maintains a secondary affiliation with MyNetworkTV. KGJT-CD is owned by Nexstar Media Group alongside CBS affiliate KREX-TV (channel 5) and is co-managed with Fox affiliate KFQX (channel 4). The three stations share studios on Hillcrest Avenue in downtown Grand Junction; KGJT-CD's transmitter is located at Land's End, east of the city.

== History ==
The station signed on for the first time on September 1, 1994, originally carrying Fox programming. After that network moved to the newly established KFQX in June 2000, the station would affiliate with UPN, and stayed with that network until folding in September 2006. After KGJT's subsequent affiliation with MyNetworkTV, its programming became available on KREX-TV's digital signal.

On January 20, 2008, at approximately 8:45 a.m., a fire knocked KREX, KFQX and KGJT off the air. The station's building and 50 years worth of archives were a total loss. Following the fire, KGJT began to simulcast KREX-TV's signal, except for Colorado Rockies baseball games on Sundays. KGJT resumed a separate schedule with MyNetworkTV programming towards the end of 2008.

KGJT simulcasts the morning newscast from its sister station, KREX-TV.

== Subchannels ==
The station's signal is multiplexed:

Subchannels of KGJT-CD
Channel	Res.	Short name	Programming
27.1	480i	KGJT-CD	Main KGJT-CD programming
27.2	1080i	KREX	CBS (KREX-TV)
27.3	480i	LAFF	Laff
27.4	480i	BOUNCE	Bounce TV

Simulcast of subchannels of another station
