= Dark (broadcasting) =

Broadcasting station that has gone off the air for an indefinite period of time

In broadcasting, a dark television station or silent radio station is one that has gone off the air for an indefinite period of time. Usually unlike dead air (broadcasting only silence), a station that is dark or silent does not even transmit a carrier signal.

== U.S. law ==
=== Transmitter operations ===
According to the U.S. Federal Communications Commission (FCC), a radio or television station is considered to have gone dark or silent if it is to be off the air for 30 days or longer. Prior to the Telecommunications Act Of 1996, a "dark" station was required to surrender its broadcast license to the FCC, leaving it vulnerable to another party applying for it while its current owner was making efforts to get it back on the air. Following the 1996 landmark legislation, a licensee is no longer required to surrender the license while dark. Instead, the licensee may apply for a "Notification Of Suspension Of Operations/Request For Silent STA" (FCC Form 0386), stating the reason why the station has gone silent.

A service can go dark for any number of reasons, including financial resources being too drained to continue effective operation of the service as being of benefit to its community of license, abandonment for a different channel or to go cable-only, complicated technical adjustments involving radio antenna repair, requiring the broadcast tower to be de-energized for the work to be done, structure fire or natural disaster that has rendered the facility inoperable, if unowned by the station, the loss of a leasehold on either the tower or the land for the transmitter, usually by sale to another party, or technical adjustments that would make it prohibitively expensive to perform the work, and carry on the normal operations of the station in question.

The service is not required to notify the FCC of silence if the period of silence is less than 10 days. If the period of silence is to last at least 10 days, but less than 30 days, the licensee must notify the FCC in writing explaining why the service is silent and an expected return to the air. A service that expects to be silent for more than 30 days must apply to the FCC using Form 0386, which can be done electronically (preferred method) or by a paper application. On this application, the date the station has gone dark or its targeted date to go silent must be stated on the application, along with the reason for silence. The Silent STA (special temporary authority) is valid for a period of 180 days. If the station is required to remain of the air beyond the 180-day period, a "Request To Extend STA" must be subsequently filed, along with the reason. However, any broadcast station that is dark (or transmits using facilities different from their license except for operation under STA) for 12 months has its license automatically canceled as a matter of law pursuant to section 312g of the Communications Act as amended. Some stations have been known to re-appear for a week or two to keep the license alive. WDHS, a television station in Iron Mountain, Michigan, was only on the air a few days a year for most of its 25-year existence, as its small market made running a religious television station (its original purpose) financially infeasible, and it was unable to position itself as a major network affiliate within the Marquette television market. It went off the air in 2015, after the FCC's new rules made its operation strategy impossible, and a year after the station's owner died, and his heir decided not to put more money into the long moribund operation.

If a station goes dark due to bankruptcy (as happened with many Equity Media Holdings stations in 2009), there is often a rush for the new owners to get a signal – any signal – on the air at least a few days before the 1-year deadline in order to avoid forfeiting the license. The Great Recession was problematic for many struggling new-entrant stations, which had to move to lower channels and convert to digital television so that UHF 52-69 TV spectrum could be repacked and sold to mobile telephone companies. A station which was already in financial trouble due to the recession often had no means to construct the new facilities before the analog shutdown, forcing the bankrupt proprietor to take the station dark until it could be sold to new owners.

=== Tower-light markings ===
While a licensed station is silent, it must continue to meet tower lighting and marking requirements as per Federal Aviation Administration (FAA) mandate. If a station (silent or otherwise) must shut down its lighting system for an extended period of time (such as it being disabled by a lightning strike), it is required to notify the FAA immediately. The station is required to provide the FAA with its assigned tower number, latitude and longitude coordinates, and an anticipated time that the tower light operations will resume. A licensee has 15 days to make the necessary repairs until the FCC is notified by the FAA. Once repairs are made, the FAA must be notified that all is well.

=== Telecommunications Act Of 1996 ===
The Telecommunications Act Of 1996 was created in part to increase the accountability of broadcasters, while providing requested deregulation in response to the hardships of many small-town broadcasters with small audiences and revenues. Under the Telecommunications Act Of 1996, licensees of stations that were listed as "silent" by the FCC (at the time around 400) were warned to either power their facilities back up or their licenses would be canceled permanently. The FCC did allow reasonable provision for broadcasters who notified them that they were trying to get back on the air. Nevertheless, many licenses were canceled, primarily those with abandoned facilities.

== See also ==
- Sign-on and sign-off
