= WMIX-FM =

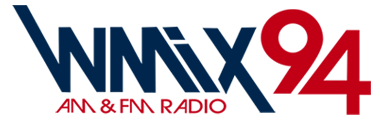
- Mount Vernon, Illinois; United States
- Broadcast area: Mount Vernon, Illinois; Carbondale, Illinois; Flora, Illinois; Vandalia, Illinois
- Frequency: 94.1 MHz
- Branding: Today's Hot Country - 94.1 WMIX

Programming
- Format: Country music

Ownership
- Owner: Withers Broadcasting; (Withers Broadcasting Company of Illinois, LLC)
- Sister stations: WMIX

History
- First air date: 1946
- Call sign meaning: Mix

Technical information
- Licensing authority: FCC
- Facility ID: 41004
- Class: B
- ERP: 50,000 watts (horiz.)
- HAAT: 168 meters (551 ft)
- Transmitter coordinates: 38°22′15.0″N 88°55′20.0″W

Links
- Public license information: Public file; LMS
- Website: www.wmix94.com

WMIX-FM (94.1 FM) is a radio station broadcasting a country music format. Licensed to Mount Vernon, Illinois, the station serves the areas of Mount Vernon, Illinois; Du Quoin, Illinois; Centralia, Illinois; and Flora, Illinois; and is owned by Withers Broadcasting, through Withers Broadcasting Company of Illinois, LLC.
