= WFRX =

- West Frankfort, Illinois; United States
- Broadcast area: Herrin, Illinois; Marion, Illinois; Benton, Illinois
- Frequency: 1300 kHz
- Branding: 95.5 The Fan

Programming
- Format: Sports
- Affiliations: Fox Sports Radio

Ownership
- Owner: Withers Broadcasting; (Withers Broadcasting of Southern Illinois, LLC)

History
- First air date: 1951

Technical information
- Licensing authority: FCC
- Facility ID: 53979
- Class: D
- Power: 1,000 watts day 60 watts night
- Transmitter coordinates: 37°53′04″N 88°55′44″W
- Translator: 95.5 W238CQ (Marion)

Links
- Public license information: Public file; LMS
- Webcast: Listen Live
- Website: 955thefan.com

WFRX (1300 AM) is a radio station licensed to West Frankfort, Illinois, United States. The station airs a sports format, and is owned by Withers Broadcasting, through Withers Broadcasting of Southern Illinois, LLC. One of the first radio stations in the United States to play a Beatles record on air, and the first to air a live interview with a Beatle, George Harrison, late September 1963.
