= KJXX =

Coordinates: 37°22′55″N 89°39′12″W

- Jackson, Missouri; United States
- Broadcast area: Cape Girardeau, Missouri; Jackson, Missouri
- Frequency: 1170 kHz

Programming
- Format: Silent

Ownership
- Owner: Withers Broadcasting; (Withers Broadcasting Company of Missouri, LLC)

History
- First air date: March 1972 (as KJAS)
- Former call signs: KJAS (1972–1986); KUGT (1986–2008)

Technical information
- Licensing authority: FCC
- Facility ID: 65795
- Class: D
- Power: 250 watts day 5 watts night
- Translator: 101.9 K270CN (Cape Girardeau)

Links
- Public license information: Public file; LMS

KJXX (1170 AM) is a radio station licensed to Jackson, Missouri. The station is owned by Dana Withers' Withers Broadcasting, with the broadcast license being held by Withers Broadcasting Company of Missouri, LLC. KJXX is also heard on 101.9 FM through a translator in Cape Girardeau, Missouri.

On January 1, 2021, KJXX changed their format from Christian talk and adult standards to rhythmic hot adult contemporary, branded as "101.9 The Block".

On June 1, 2026, the station went off the air along with some of its sister stations as part of a reorganization effort by the owner.

== Translator ==
Call sign	Frequency	City of license	FID	ERP (W)	HAAT	Class	FCC info
K270CN	101.9 FM	Cape Girardeau, Missouri	138439	250	0 m (0 ft)	D	LMS
