= Paul Dixon Show =

- Genre: Variety/Comedy/Talk/Music
- Created by: John Murphy; Paul Dixon
- Directed by: Gordon Waltz; Steve Womack
- Presented by: Paul Dixon; Bonnie Lou (co-host); Colleen Sharp (co-host)
- Theme music composer: Bruce Brownfield
- Country of origin: United States
- Original language: English

Production
- Executive producer: John Murphy
- Production locations: WLWT Studios, Crosley Square, Cincinnati, Ohio
- Running time: 30 minutes (later expanded to 90)

Original release
- Release: April 1955 – December 1974

The Paul Dixon Show is an American television variety program originating in Cincinnati on WLWT Television beginning in 1955 and ending in December 1974, following Dixon's death. The show began as a 30-minute series expanding to 90 minutes in the 1960s, but the other stations along the Crosley/Avco regional television network in nearby Dayton, Columbus and Indianapolis only ran 60 minutes of the show. Pre-recorded episodes were sold to other markets throughout the Midwest.

The show was originally co-hosted by Bonnie Lou and Marian Spelman, who was later replaced by Colleen Sharp. The house band, originally called The Bel-Aires, was led by pianist Bruce Brownfield.

== Early beginnings ==
Dixon originally hosted a show on rival station WCPO-TV with Dottie Mack and Wanda Lewis called Paul Dixon's Song Shop. The show consisted of Dixon, Mack, and Lewis pantomiming to popular songs of the day, and also featured in-studio commercials. Fresh from a career in radio news, Dixon quickly endeared himself to countless viewers for years to come. Song Shop was picked up for a season by ABC in 1951 and by the DuMont Television Network in 1954. For the DuMont show he moved to New York City, but as DuMont began to collapse in 1955, a homesick Dixon returned to Cincinnati a year later and, in a fateful move, hired on at WLWT.

While Dixon was at WCPO, Al Lewis (rapidly gaining fame in his own right as Uncle Al) was in charge of set design and artwork on Dixon's show. After Dixon moved to WLWT, The Paul Dixon Show and The Uncle Al Show would run against each other on weekday mornings.

== ”This Dumb Show” ==
By 1955, Dixon started working at WLWT to host a daytime show originally geared to housewives, but that ultimately appealed to people from all walks of life. Over time, Dixon himself would refer to the program, in a self-deprecating fashion, as "this dumb show". Every morning the show would start with Paul using a pair of binoculars (one of what would become many of Dixon’s trademarks) to examine what came to be called “Kneesville”, which consisted of women sitting in the front row, all wearing either short skirts or “hot pants”. He would then award who he believed had the best-looking knees by either putting a garter on the woman's leg, or attaching a "knee tickler" to the hem of her skirt.

Some of his other trademarks included, but were not limited to:

- His nickname. Everyone who knew Dixon or watched his show took to calling him "Paul Baby". (Dixon acquired the nickname from a prop boy, Al Bischof, who replied to a request by Dixon saying, "Okay, Paul Baby!" The nickname stuck with Dixon for the rest of his life.)
- A spray bottle, used to spritz the audience upon asking how many of them took a bath that morning, which was usually a segue into a commercial for bath soap.
- Dixon would strike a "runway pose" during a shampoo or hair care commercial (or some instance that might require him to take off his jacket), and the band played the first few bars of A Pretty Girl is Like A Melody.
- By the 1970s, Dixon had started giving T-shirts to women in the audience, with Dixon physically putting them on the women himself, doing it in such a way that would work itself into an embrace between the two.
- On almost every show, Dixon would give an Osherwicz Kosher Salami to at least one member of the audience (usually a woman) after chatting with him or her or when he or she gave him a gift. (David Letterman would later incorporate a variation of this into his own show, instead giving canned hams to people in the audience for their participation in a skit.)
- At the mere mention of the word "letters" (referring to fan mail), Bruce Brownfield and the Band played a quick rendition of the song I'm Gonna Sit Right Down and Write Myself A Letter.

Despite the fact that Dixon performed basically the same routine every day, viewers would continually watch his show, many of them admitting, often with varying degrees of embarrassment, that they were "hooked" on "Paul Baby."

Guest appearances by celebrities were a rarity at best. Among those who did make appearances were comedian Imogene Coca, actor David McCallum, Senator Robert F. Kennedy, and even Bob Hope, who was a close friend of Dixon and who wrote the foreword for Dixon's first book Paul Baby.

=== Classic moments ===
Besides in-studio commercials, a musical number from the house band, a song each from Colleen and Bonnie, and occasionally a song from Dixon himself, who swore he couldn't sing to save his own life, the show primarily consisted of Paul talking with members of his audience, or reading letters from his viewers, both of which often resulted in hilarious situations:

- On the day of the "Chicken Wedding" (see below), a woman in the audience told Dixon about her female neighbor's TV set having broken the night before. Her husband, who worked nights, got home in time to watch Dixon's show, so she wanted to tell him right then and there to go next door to invite her neighbor over so the two could watch the show together; she finished by telling them, still on the air, to “be good and be careful”.
- Dixon once read a letter on the air from a farmer in Arkansas who had gotten “hooked” on the show while sick in bed. According to the letter, the farmer's illness had been brought on by bad whiskey; his wife had also gotten hooked shortly afterward. When Dixon called the farmer and talked to him live on the air, he asked Dixon to send him one of the T-shirts he gave to the women on his show so he could put it on his wife. The farmer later made an in-person appearance on the show.
- On Crosley/Avco upper management suggestion, Dixon held a "Mystery Voice Contest", in which he would call a number selected at random from the phone book. If there was an answer on the other end, Dixon played a pre-recorded voice for him or her to identify, with the contestant winning a large prize if correct. The first voice was Ralph Lazarus, then-CEO of the Cincinnati-based Federated Department Stores. After a huge promotion and buildup to the first day of the contest, the very first contestant Dixon called and played the voice for- keep in mind that the number was chosen at random, immediately guessed Ralph Lazarus. In disbelief, Dixon asked how the player, a woman, could possibly have known Lazarus' voice; she laughingly replied she used to be his private secretary.
- In the early 1950s, when Dixon's producer John Smith contracted polio, Dixon started a campaign for Smith to receive get-well cards and over the course of a year, Smith received thousands of cards from across the country. Unfortunately, Smith died from polio complications in 1954.

While Dixon's antics by today's standards might be construed as chauvinistic or even over-the-top sexist, there was an unspoken understanding between Dixon and his audience, both in-studio and at home, that he was only seeking the laughs and cheers that the antics generated. Dixon was happily married with two children.

David Letterman credits Paul Dixon for inspiring his choice of career as a talk-show host. Letterman frequently viewed the show as a youngster on Crosley/Avco Indianapolis station WLWI, where he later began his professional broadcasting career in the 1970s.

=== Dixon's pet expressions ===
- "This is the most beautiful, youngest group we've ever had on this television show!"
  (usually said right before grabbing his binoculars to check out Kneesville)
- "Hold it, we've got a live one here, Gordy!"
  (referring to someone in the audience who had something to say to Dixon. "Gordy" was the nickname of director Gordon Waltz)
- (singing) "...and the angels lit the candles!"
- "Isn't this the dumbest television show you ever saw in your life???"
- "How come you're not at home watching Uncle Al??"
  (Dixon sometimes asked this of children who appeared on the show)

== The "Chicken Wedding" ==
Harry & Pauline from the "Chicken Wedding"

At one point a fan had sent Dixon a rubber chicken as a souvenir. He began calling the chicken Pauline, using it/her as a prop when he did commercials for the Cincinnati-based Kroger grocery chain, saying "Kroger has a special on chicken", and then invariably tossing it/her over his shoulder. Another fan sent him an additional rubber chicken which Dixon took to calling Harry, who became a "companion" for Pauline. Over time people began to ask if Dixon was going to marry the feathered couple. Dixon was initially against the idea, but as more and more people, including WLWT head John Murphy, continued to ask when he would perform the "Chicken Wedding", Dixon finally capitulated, and in so doing made television history.

On Tuesday, March 11, 1969, Dixon staged the first-ever wedding for two rubber chickens, complete with all the trimmings. The wedding itself was broadcast live on the show, and featured then-WLWT news anchor Tom Atkins narrating and Bob Braun as Best Man, with co-hosts Bonnie Lou and Sharp as matrons of honor. Marian Spelman, still at WLWT appearing on other shows, made a guest appearance singing a humorous version of A Bird in a Gilded Cage.

Some people actually stayed home from work and school to watch the "Chicken Wedding" live. It went on to become the highest-rated episode in the show's history, and to this day WLWT receives more requests and questions about this particular episode than any other broadcasts in the station's more than 70 years of history. As recently as 2023, WLWT aired a replay of the episode during the early hours of Christmas morning.

=== Live at the Ohio State Fair ===
Beginning in 1966 on a request from then-Ohio Governor Jim Rhodes, The Paul Dixon Show (and other regional shows on the Crosley/Avco network) began making annual visits to the Ohio State Fair, broadcasting their shows live on location. The following year, attendance at the state fair increased by an estimated 1.2 million. The live shows at the fair continued well into the 1970s.

By the end of the 1960s, nearly 600,000 people had been a part of Dixon's studio audience, (by comparison, this figure is roughly twice the 2019 population of Cincinnati proper), and Dixon had given away in excess of 3,000 Osherwicz Kosher Salamis. At the show's peak, there was a two-year waiting list for tickets.

== Sponsors and commercials ==
Most of the commercials on Dixon's show were performed live by Dixon himself, but also frequently by one of his co-hosts. Dixon shunned the use of scripts when doing commercials, much to the perpetual delight of his audience. In the tradition of Ruth Lyons, any product plugged by Dixon would quickly fly off of local merchants' shelves.

- When Dixon did commercials for Bounty paper towels, he would always mention they were made in Green Bay, Wisconsin, at which point the band would launch into a quick chorus of the Wisconsin Fight Song.
- Dixon was also one of the first to jump on the bandwagon plugging what was then called Pringle's Newfangled Potato Chips, largely because they were invented in Montgomery, Ohio, near Cincinnati. For levity, Bonnie and Colleen often made duck bills out of them.
- In the early 1970s, Dixon was among the first television personalities to sell Orville Redenbacher’s Gourmet Popcorn, based in Indiana. During the commercial, the director would superimpose Redenbacher's face (as it appeared on the jar) over Dixon's while he would talk about the product.

== See also ==
- List of programs broadcast by the DuMont Television Network
- List of surviving DuMont Television Network broadcasts

== Bibliography ==
- David Weinstein, The Forgotten Network: DuMont and the Birth of American Television (Philadelphia: Temple University Press, 2004) ISBN 1-59213-245-6
- Alex McNeil, Total Television, Fourth edition (New York: Penguin Books, 1980) ISBN 0-14-024916-8
- Tim Brooks and Earle Marsh, The Complete Directory to Prime Time Network TV Shows, Third edition (New York: Ballantine Books, 1964) ISBN 0-345-31864-1
