= The Uncle Al Show =

- Created by: Al Lewis; Mort Watters
- Starring: "Uncle Al" Lewis; Wanda Lewis (1956–1985)
- Ending theme: "It's a Small World" by Robert & Richard Sherman
- Country of origin: United States

Original release
- Network: WCPO (1950–1985); ABC (1958–1959)
- Release: June 12, 1950 – May 29, 1985

The Uncle Al Show is a children's television program originating in Cincinnati. The show was hosted by Cleveland native Al Lewis (1924–2009) (not to be confused with the actor who played Grandpa on The Munsters), and later was co-hosted by his wife, Wanda.

The show enjoyed a remarkable 35-year run (1950–1985) on WCPO-TV, making it one of the longest-running local children's shows in American TV history. (Sesame Street holds the national record, being on the air continuously since 1969.) Uncle Al holds the unofficial record for the longest-running regularly scheduled series with the same host for the show's entire run.

== History ==
The show's origins were completely by happenstance. In the summer of 1949, then-General Manager Mort Watters asked Lewis (hired two months earlier as WCPO's first art director) to host an hour-long filler show called Al's Corner Drugstore, in which Lewis, dressed in a soda jerk's uniform, would take phone-in requests for songs which he would play on his accordion, which would later become one of his many trademarks along with his straw boater hat.

At that time, the show was not aired on a closed set, so people could walk in from off the street to watch the show in person. Neighborhood children began doing just that, and Lewis, having a natural affinity for children, invited them onto the stage during the show. The same kids would return on subsequent occasions bringing friends, and they all took to calling Lewis "Uncle Al".

When mothers began calling into the station requesting tickets to be on The Uncle Al Show, a Cincinnati institution was born. The Uncle Al Show made its official début on June 12, 1950. Originally a 15-minute outing, it quickly expanded into an hour long show airing three episodes daily:

First episode: 9–10 am (ET)
Second episode: 11 am – 12 noon (ET)
Third episode: 1–2 pm (ET)

By the mid-late 1960s the show was scaled back to one 90-minute episode per day from 9 to 10:30 am, running opposite WLWT's Paul Dixon Show.

By 1955 Uncle Al had become so popular that executives from CBS came to Cincinnati to consult with Al about hosting a similar show on their network. This was before WCPO switched affiliation from ABC to CBS in 1961. Station executives understandably refused to release Lewis from his contract, so CBS brass settled on Howdy Doody alum Bob Keeshan to host their new kids' show, which became Captain Kangaroo. When WCPO switched networks, both shows ran back-to-back on weekday mornings.

Lewis' wife Wanda joined the show in 1956. Initially, Wanda was called "Captain Windy", costumed in a superhero-like outfit during the early days of the show, and was seen "flying" Superman-style before she made her entrance on stage. Her shy, quiet manner inspired colleague Paul Dixon to call her "The Windy One" when they co-starred on their own show.

Uncle Al's show was picked up by ABC from October 18, 1958, until September 19, 1959.

== Uncle Al & the kids ==
The kids who visited Uncle Al were more than just audience members; most of them were selected to be active participants in different skits on the show. While Wanda would handle the more educational aspects of the show, featuring kids assisting in one way or another, Uncle Al got kids involved as helpers for puppets doing different odd jobs, or he would enlist a child from the crowd on-the-spot to be a barker for games at Uncle Al's circus ("Step right up! Win a prize!"). At the age of eight, George Clooney appeared in a 1970 episode of Uncle Al playing a ship's captain in one of the show's skits.

By the 1960s, kids who appeared on the show each were given a name-tag sticker in the shape of a bow tie modeled after Uncle Al's sartorial trademark. While the kids were told the name tag was a ticket to get in and a souvenir to take home, the primary reason for them was so that Lewis could refer to each child by name. Initially the tags were plain white, but later included the name of the show to one side, and WCPO's "9" logo to the other, with room in the middle for the child's name.

Other activities included dance contests, celebrating birthdays of kids in the audience that day (which was usually done during their trip to the circus near the end of the show) and singing, accompanied by Al himself, who often played either a banjo, a guitar or his trademark accordion singing simple ditties like this one:

"When we sing together songs are such delight..
Har-mo-nee makes the melody right.."

Each day the show would end with Uncle Al, Wanda and the kids all singing a prayer on the air before the kids made their way off the stage:

(they sang the first three lines of the prayer)

"Help me, God, to love you more,
Than I ever did before,
In my work and in my play,

(the last five lines they spoke)

Please be with me through the day,
Thank you for the friends we meet,
Thank you for the food we eat,
Thank you for the birds that sing,
Thank you, God, for everything!"

The cast and the kids would then say their goodbyes and the kids would walk off the set as the closing credits ran. The show's closing theme was the last few verses of the Disney standard It's a Small World written by Robert & Richard Sherman.

== Unusual moments ==
In a 1990 interview, Lewis related an incident during a live show where he saw a little girl offstage sitting on his accordion, Lewis often assigned one of the kids' mothers to watch his accordion for him when he wasn't playing it. On this occasion, it was the assigned mother's daughter who was sitting on the accordion. After a commercial break, Lewis went to retrieve the accordion to play it on camera and the keys promptly got stuck; the girl had urinated into his accordion. Thankfully, the instrument was insured and replaced, much to the chagrin of the insurer.

In 1984, a young boy on the show started running around the set and breaking props. As fake trees started to fall over during one of Uncle Al's sing-along-songs, the station had to cut to commercial break. The young boy’s mother was called out in the audience to come retrieve him and he was never allowed on the show again.

== Sponsors ==
One of the show's many trademarks was when they would go to an external commercial, Uncle Al would get everyone in front of the camera to say "magic words":

"Ala-kazam one, Ala-kazam two, Ala-kazam three, and POOF!!"

But on equally frequent occasions, they would do in-studio commercials for various local businesses. These included, but were not limited to:

- Kahn's Wieners: Billed at the time as "The Wiener the World Awaited", these commercials sometimes featured a talking puppet in the shape of a "Man in the Moon" frankfurter, possibly created by puppeteer Larry Smith.
- Mama's Cookies: Uncle Al and the kids together would sing a variation of "Shortnin' Bread" as the jingle in this commercial.
- Barq's Soft Drinks: This was when Barq's had other flavors in addition to root beer; Barq's had orange, grape, lemon-lime, and cream soda flavors as well. Wanda performed the jingle while she and an assistant served drinks to the kids.
- Al Naish Movers: Associated at one time with Mayflower movers, Naish was known for giving toy trucks to their customers' kids. The family-owned company is still in business today.
- Pat & Joe's: A now-defunct husband-and-wife-owned chain of five-volume furniture stores in and around the Cincinnati area; the show used a jingle sung to the tune of "Mary Had A Little Lamb" which went:

My good friends are Pat & Joe, Pat & Joe, Pat & Joe,
my good friends are Pat & Joe, they save your mommy do-ough..

- Albers' Grocery Store: These commercials featured children holding signs with the letters A, L, B, E, R, S. and "'". They were to smile, and the child with the apostrophe would make it bob up and down while the Albers' jingle played. Children were encouraged to go to Albers' and say, "Uncle Al sent me," for a complimentary lollipop.

=== Regulars ===
Uncle Al's farm was also frequented by his in-house friends, which at one time or another included:

- Pal the Dog (Tom York), Uncle Al's pet
- Lucky the Clown Used mainly when they visited the circus near the end of each show.
  (originally played by Jack Williams, and by Artie Scheff on the weekend version)
- The Merry Mailman: A puppet who delivered viewer mail to Uncle Al every day.
  (the producers used the last few lines of the Ray Heatherton song from the New York kids show of the same name)
- The Ding-A-Lings: A group of giggling, dancing squiggly columns.
- The Weather People: These consisted of kids dressed in double-sided sun and cloud costumes (one side happy, the other side sad). If the weather forecast for a given day called for sunshine, the sun costume would be turned happy for the camera, and a "pity party" would be briefly held for the sad cloud. The opposite, of course, would ensue if that day's forecast called for rain.
- Mr. Patches (Tom McGreevey): When going to a commercial break from a skit he was in, Mr. Patches would say some magic words of his own, finishing with a "hum-m-m-m-m-mmmmm".
- Ernie the Ape Introduced in song with "Hi Ernie, Hi Ernie...what do you know and what do you say"....Ernie would reply "Hi Uncle, Hi Captain, can I have my banana today."

Some of the cast members went on to become beloved Cincinnati TV personalities in their own right. Most notable among these were:

Larry Smith: Dayton native Smith began his Cincinnati TV career with The Uncle Al Show handling and performing (and even creating) most of the puppets; he remained with the show for six years. Starting in the late 1960s he hosted his own afternoon kids cartoon show on WXIX. Smith died in February 2018.

Bob Shreve: A consummate performer, Shreve played various characters including Roger the Robot and, at one point, Lucky the Clown. He was a commercial pitchman for various Cincinnati businesses including Schoenling Beer and Pool City, and hosted late night movie shows that, at one time or another, ran on all three major Cincinnati TV stations and even one station in nearby Dayton over a 40-year period. Shreve died in February 1990.

Mike Tangi: Tangi worked both behind and in front of the camera on Uncle Al and at WCPO in general from 1953 to 1963. He later worked with Glenn Ryle at WKRC-TV before going into advertising in the 1970s, writing and performing memorable commercials for King Kwik Minit Markets. Tangi died in 1995.

== Later years ==
Throughout the years The Uncle Al Show remained a perennial ratings champion in Cincinnati, especially when the show ran three times a day. Personalities from competing stations knew they were in trouble when their shows were rescheduled opposite Uncle Al. The show ran an estimated 15,000 episodes, with an estimated 440,000 children having appeared on the show throughout its run.

By 1975, the show had adopted a more educational base, with guest appearances by members of the Cincinnati Police and Fire departments, representatives from the Cincinnati Zoo, educators and many others. But despite the educational enrichments, The Uncle Al Show continued to hold fast to the values the children loved from day one.

By the early 1980s, demographics were changing, and The Uncle Al Show was not immune. The show was first cut down to a half-hour, and then moved from its weekday slot to an early-morning weekend show. The show was renamed Uncle Al Town with the final episode taped on May 29, 1985. Both Al and Wanda remained at WCPO to the end of the 1980s.

Al and Wanda both retired to their home, a large farm near Hillsboro, Ohio. But in retirement, the Lewises remained active in their community, and on occasion made appearances at festivals and other functions in Cincinnati. Surrounded by his family, Al Lewis died at his Hillsboro home on February 28, 2009, at the age of 84. He was survived by his wife Wanda, his four daughters and his 13 grandchildren. Wanda died August 17, 2020, at the age of 94.

== Sources and external links ==
- TVParty! - Cincinnati Local TV Kid Shows
- TVParty! - MORE Cincinnati Locals
