= Elvis Presley: The Searcher (soundtrack) =

Soundtrack album by Elvis Presley
- Released: April 6, 2018
- Recorded: July 1954 – February 1976
- Length: 49:19
- Label: RCA, Legacy
- Producer: Ernst Mikael Jørgensen (exec.), Thom Zimny, Jon Landau (exec.)

Elvis Presley chronology
Christmas with Elvis (2017)	Elvis Presley: The Searcher (2018)	Where No One Stands Alone (2018)

Elvis Presley: The Searcher is the soundtrack to the 2018 documentary of the same name, which garnered some 900,000 viewers for HBO when first shown on April 14, 2018. It includes 18 songs by Elvis Presley, including rare alternative versions. The album was released on April 6, 2018 by RCA Records and Legacy Recordings.

The video, also released in 2018, stayed six weeks within the top three releases, including three weeks at the top. On 28 December 2018, it earned a B.P.I. Gold Award certifying sales of 25,000 copies (streams, digital downloads and physical sales).

== Track listing ==
No.	Title	Writer(s)	Length
1.	"Trouble / Guitar Man" (Live NBC Studios, Burbank, CA June 1968)	Jerry Leiber and Mike Stoller / Jerry Reed	3:26
2.	"My Baby Left Me"	Arthur Crudup	2:12
3.	"That's All Right"	Arthur Crudup	1:55
4.	"Baby, Let's Play House"	Arthur Gunter	2:15
5.	"Heartbreak Hotel"	Mae Boren Axton; Thomas Durden; Elvis Presley	2:07
6.	"Lawdy, Miss Clawdy"	Lloyd Price	2:07
7.	"Hound Dog"	Jerry Leiber and Mike Stoller	2:16
8.	"Crawfish"	Fred Wise; Ben Weisman	1:48
9.	"Mona Lisa"	Ray Evans; Jay Livingston	2:30
10.	"Milky White Way"	Lander Coleman	2:14
11.	"Like a Baby"	Jesse Stone	2:39
12.	"Are You Lonesome Tonight?"	Lou Handman; Roy Turk	3:06
13.	"It's Now or Never"	Wally Gold; Aaron Schroeder; Eduardo di Capua	3:15
14.	"Tomorrow Is a Long Time"	Bob Dylan	5:21
15.	"Suspicious Minds" (Take 6)	Mark James	3:15
16.	"Separate Ways" (Rehearsal Version)	Red West; Richard Mainegra	3:25
17.	"Hurt" (Take 5)	Jimmie Crane; Al Jacobs	2:08
18.	"If I Can Dream" (Live NBC Studios, Burbank, CA June 1968)	Walter Earl Brown	3:20
Total length:			49:19

== Charts ==
Chart (2018)	Peak position
Austrian Albums (Ö3 Austria)	38
Belgian Albums (Ultratop Flanders)	44
Belgian Albums (Ultratop Wallonia)	87
Dutch Albums (Album Top 100)	81
German Albums (Offizielle Top 100)	58
Scottish Albums (OCC)	12
Swiss Albums (Schweizer Hitparade)	64
UK Albums (OCC)	32
UK Soundtrack Albums (OCC)	2
US Billboard 200	145
