= Where No One Stands Alone =

Where No One Stands Alone may refer to:

- "Where No One Stands Alone", a song on 1967 Elvis Presley album How Great Thou Art
- Where No One Stands Alone (album), 2018 Elvis Presley compilation album
