= Paul Dixon (entertainer) =

American television personality

- Dixon in 1970 publicity photo
- Born: Gregory Schleier; October 2, 1918; Earling, Iowa, U.S.
- Died: December 28, 1974 (aged 56); Cincinnati, Ohio, U.S.
- Occupations: Radio announcer and newscaster, disc jockey, television personality, daytime talk/variety show host
- Spouse: Marge Dixon
- Children: Pamela, Greg

Paul Dixon (October 2, 1918 – December 28, 1974) was a daytime television personality and talk show host in Cincinnati, Ohio. He began his career with radio shows in New York City and Chicago before being enticed to come to then-radio station WCPO in Cincinnati as a news reporter and announcer around 1945. He was chosen best newscaster in Cincinnati in 1947 after conducting an interview with men trapped in a collapsed downtown building.

Eventually abandoning radio news in favor of entertainment, he spent his first few years in television as host of Paul Dixon's Song Shop, a three-hour daily show he co-hosted with Dottie Mack and Wanda Lewis pantomiming to records of the day. By 1954 his show was so popular that Dumont Television enticed Dixon to come to New York to do the show nationally. After a year a homesick Dixon returned to Cincinnati, and hired on at WLWT to host a new daytime TV show geared to housewives.

== Television ==
The Paul Dixon Show, after having aired on the DuMont network from September 29, 1952, to April 8, 1955, premiered on Cincinnati's WLWT in 1955. The show began as a half-hour program, but later expanded to 90 minutes with co-hosts Bonnie Lou and Colleen Sharp. Avco Broadcasting Corporation, which owned WLWT, syndicated Dixon's show in other markets where it owned TV stations, including Columbus and Dayton, Ohio and Indianapolis, Indiana. "Paul Baby", as he came to be known (the nickname was given him by a prop boy) had a breezy style and a sense of humor that appealed to housewives and others alike.

On Tuesday, March 11, 1969, he staged a wedding for two rubber chickens that had become longtime props on the show (they were mainly used for in-studio commercials for Kroger). Fellow Cincinnati TV personality Bob Braun appeared as Best Man, with Colleen Sharp and Bonnie Lou as Matrons of Honor. To this day the chicken wedding remains a significant piece of WLWT's (and Cincinnati's) television history. Former late night TV host David Letterman, who grew up in Indianapolis, cited Dixon's comedic talent as inspiration for his own antics.

== Author ==
Dixon wrote and published two books:

- Paul Baby: Confessions of the Mayor of Kneesville (1968)
- Letters to Paul Baby (1970), a compilation of Dixon's favorite fan mail.

== Personal life ==
Dixon was born Gregory Schleier in Earling, Iowa in 1918 to Katheryn and Henry Schleier. He started using his air name sometime in the mid-1940s and legally changed his own name to Paul and his family's name to Dixon in December 1951.

Dixon and his wife Marge had two children, Pamela and Greg. Dixon suffered his first heart attack in 1970, shortly after his son Greg was killed in a car accident, after which a grieving Dixon had to be helped on stage to do his show for a time. Personal complications later led to a ruptured aneurysm, which claimed Paul's life on December 28, 1974; his funeral was broadcast live over the stations in the Avco network that carried his show. As they were in the process of liquidating the company's broadcasting properties, Avco executives concluded that Dixon could not be replaced, and consequently, The Paul Dixon Show quietly ended its near-20-year run in January 1975. His daughter Pamela married Robert Sibcy in 1971 and they now co-own a major realty company. Dixon is buried in Cincinnati's Gate of Heaven Cemetery; his wife Marge died in 2003.
