= Larry Smith (puppeteer) =

American puppeteer (1938–2018)

Larry Smith (June 23, 1938 – February 19, 2018) was an American puppeteer and producer of children's programming in the Cincinnati area since 1957. His most notable work was a popular afternoon puppet/cartoon show airing on WXIX Television.

Smith was raised in Dayton, Ohio. At the age of five he began a lifelong fascination with puppets, learning to make them at home using items around the house as store-bought materials were expensive. He made his television debut in 1952, and he began his professional career two years later at WHIO television. After high school Smith attended Ohio State University and the Cincinnati College Conservatory of Music. In 1955, Smith met Burr Tillstrom, creator of the Kukla, Fran and Ollie show. In 1957, Smith auditioned for and won a part on The Uncle Al Show; officially he served on WCPO's art department, but he performed puppets. Smith was with The Uncle Al Show for six years.

Smith achieved his greatest fame by the late 1960s, when he went to then-new TV station WXIX in Cincinnati to host an afternoon puppet/cartoon show which came to be called Larry Smith's Cartoon Club, which he hosted throughout the 1970s. Smith and his puppets were the first stars of WXIX when they performed on the station's sign-on ceremony in August 1968.

Some of the puppets/characters he created include:

Hattie the Witch (also called "Battie Hattie from Cincinnati")
Snarfie the Dog (a.k.a. Snarfie R. Dog)
Big Red the Red Rock-Eater (who lived in "The Dirty Dingy Dungeon")
Teaser the Mouse
Rudy the Rooster

Smith ostensibly retired in 2000 but made occasional appearances with his puppets until his death on February 19, 2018.
