= The Trumpeteers =

Gospel quartet from Baltimore, Maryland

Background information
- Origin: Baltimore, Maryland, United States
- Genres: Gospel
- Years active: 1946–1984
- Label: Aladdin Records
- Past members: Joseph E. Johnson; James Keels; Raleigh Turnage; Willie MacNair

The Trumpeteers (also known as the CBS Trumpeteers) were an American gospel group formed in Baltimore, Maryland. They evolved from another gospel group known as the Willing Four. Joseph E. Johnson (lead vocals), an alumnus of the Willing Four and the Golden Gate Quartet, put them together with James Keels (bass), Raleigh Turnage (tenor) and Willie MacNair (baritone) in 1946. Like similar gospel groups, the quartet adopted the Golden Gate Quartet's jubilee style, and began broadcasting jingles and promotions on WCAO radio in Baltimore for a sponsoring shoe company. Not long after, they were offered a regular broadcast spot by CBS Radio to replace the recently departed Jubalaires.

Leo Mesner, co-owner and operator of Aladdin Records, heard one of the Trumpeteers' live broadcasts, sensing promise in their take on "Milky White Way", a song written and recorded by Landor Coleman of the Coleman Brothers in 1944. The group recorded five songs, including "Milky White Way" for Aladdin in September 1947, debuting their version on the label's newly launched Score Records gospel subsidiary in May 1948. The single became one of the first immensely popular gospel records in the post-war era, reaching number 8 on the Billboard "Race Records" chart, reputedly selling over one million copies, and inspiring several other arrangements by musical acts like the Spirit of Memphis Quartet, Silvertone Singers, and Elvis Presley on his first gospel album, His Hand in Mine in 1960. The Trumpeteers rerecorded the tune numerous times as well.

To keep the group commercially accessible, Aladdin Records organized a session crediting them as the Rockets and focusing entirely on secular songs. The result failed to match the success of "Milky White Way". the Trumpeteers' 17 singles for Score, issued across a five-year period, sold encouragingly. During this stint, they also released two singles with King Records in 1949 and 1950. Johnson kept different line-ups active until his death in 1984, and baritone singer Calvin Stewart, who had joined in 1950, then led the group.
