= Crosley Broadcasting Corporation =

American radio and TV company

- Type: Public
- Founded: March 22, 1922 (with the sign-on of WLW)
- Founder: Powel Crosley Jr.
- Defunct: 1968 (Crosley name retired); 1977 (last of Avco radio broadcast assets sold)
- Fate: Assets divided
- Successor: Avco Broadcasting
- Headquarters: Cincinnati, Ohio, U.S

The Crosley Broadcasting Corporation was a radio and television broadcaster founded by radio manufacturing pioneer Powel Crosley Jr. It had a major influence in the early years of radio and television broadcasting, and helped the Voice of America carry its message around the world.

== History ==
=== Early years ===
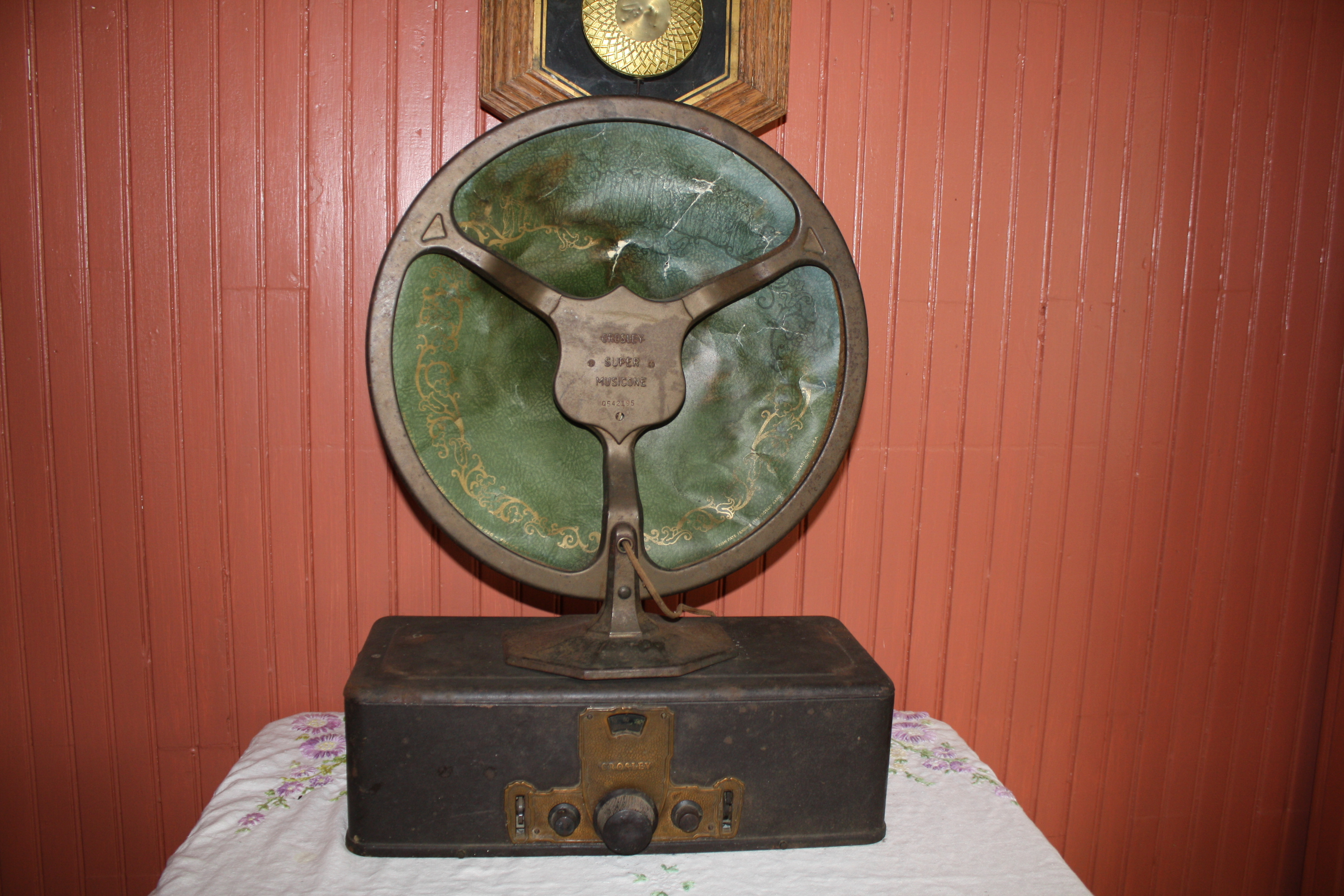
Crosley Super Musicone speaker, back of speaker shown, on top of a Crosley radio

The company was founded by pioneer radio station operator Powel Crosley and was based in Cincinnati, Ohio. Its flagship station, WLW (AM), was first licensed in March 1922. Most of its broadcast properties adopted call signs with "WLW" as the first three letters. In the 1930s, WLW had an effective power of 500,000 watts, and was the only commercial U.S. AM broadcasting station ever to be permitted to transmit regularly with more than 50,000 watts. The 500,000 watt transmissions were only allowed by the FCC in the "experimental" hours, midnight to 6:00 AM, and the signal was heard in many places, including Europe.

By the 1950s, the company operated a small television network in Ohio and Indiana.

During World War II, Crosley built the Bethany Relay Station in Butler County, Ohio's Union Township, one mile west of its transmitter for WLW, for the United States Office of War Information. It operated as many as five shortwave radio stations, using the call signs WLWK, WLWL, WLWO, WLWR, and WLWS. Many of these stations were later incorporated into the Voice of America. Crosley operated the facilities for the government until 1963.

In 1945, the Crosley interests were purchased by Aviation Corporation. The radio and appliance manufacturing arm changed its name to Avco, but the broadcast operations continued to operate under the Crosley name until they adopted the Avco name in 1968.

Crosley (Avco) also owned WLWF, an FM broadcasting station it operated along with its Columbus, Ohio TV outlet WLWC (now WCMH-TV). WLWF went silent in 1953, and Crosley (Avco) returned its license to the Federal Communications Commission (FCC). In the late 1950s, a construction permit for a new station on WLWF's frequency was granted to Taft Broadcasting, owner of WTVN-TV, also in Columbus (now WSYX), which started the station in late 1959 as WTVN-FM (now WLVQ).

=== Television network ===
From the 1950s through the 1970s, Crosley operated a small television network in which programs were produced at one of its stations and broadcast on the other Crosley stations in the Midwest, and occasionally by non-Crosley stations as well. The company occasionally produced programs picked up for broadcast on either NBC or the DuMont Television Network. Programs which aired nationally included NBC's Midwestern Hayride (on which Rosemary Clooney often performed) and Breakfast Party. Other programs originated on the Crosley network included DuMont's The Paul Dixon Show and The Ruth Lyons 50-50 Club. The Phil Donahue Show started in 1967, originating from WLWD in Dayton, Ohio.

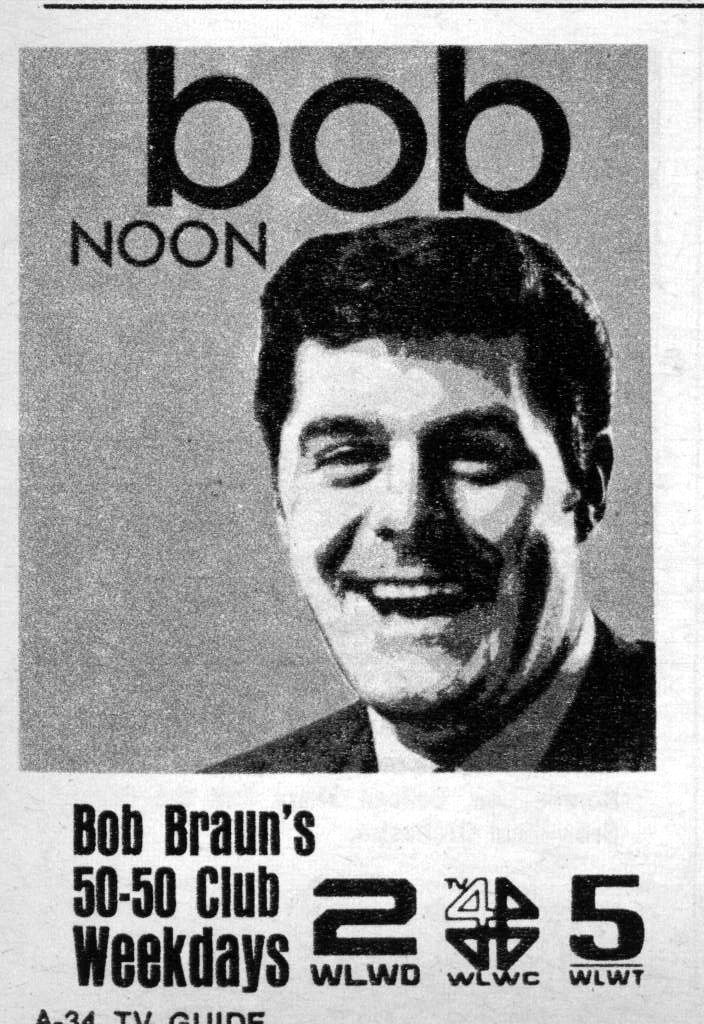
1969 Advertisement for The Bob Braun Show appearing in TV Guide.

In 1968, Avco, which had just purchased Embassy Pictures, formed an unrelated company called Avco Embassy Television, to syndicate the Embassy film library on TV. Avco Embassy originally syndicated The Phil Donahue Show, before the syndicated division of Avco Broadcasting was formed. In 1971, Avco and cartoon producer Hanna-Barbera teamed up for the holiday specials on its network.

In the 1970s, Avco sold all of its broadcasting holdings. In 1975, it sold WLWC-TV in Columbus, WLWI-TV in Indianapolis, WOAI-AM-FM-TV in San Antonio (the AM station was sold to the nascent Clear Channel Communications as the chain's second property), and WWDC-AM-FM in Washington D.C. In 1976, it sold WLW and WLWT-TV in Cincinnati, WLWD-TV in Dayton, and its Avco Embassy Television and Avco Embassy Program Sales divisions. In 1977, it sold KYA-AM-FM in San Francisco and WRTH in Wood River/St. Louis.

The closest equivalent to a "successor" to Avco Broadcasting was Multimedia, Inc. Avco sold flagship TV station WLWT to Multimedia, as well as Avco Program Sales in 1976. In December 1995, Gannett (which owned former Crosley station WXIA-TV in Atlanta) acquired Multimedia, Inc., while the respective syndication division was acquired by MCA Universal. By 1997, all of the original Crosley radio and television properties had been sold off by its successor companies, with the exception of WTHR in Indianapolis, which is now owned by Tegna Inc. since they acquired the Dispatch Broadcast Group in 2019.

The deserted ruins of the major Crosley manufacturing facility can still be seen on the west side of I-75, just north of the area where the Cincinnati Museum Center (previously the Union Terminal train station) is currently located and near where Crosley Field once stood. The impressively huge transmission tower and old 50,000-watt transmitter at the Tylersville Road facility near U.S. Route 42 (Reading Rd.), between Dayton and Cincinnati, still exists.

=== WLW- call letters ===
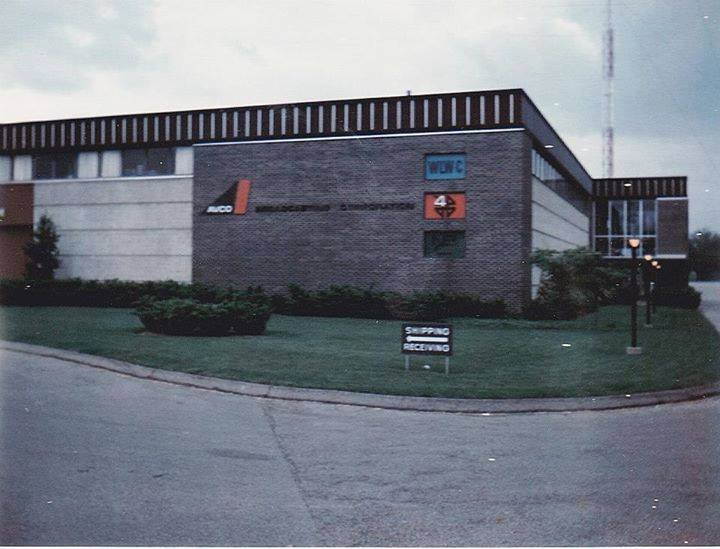
WLWC Studios in the 1960s.

Many of the "WLW-" station call-letters persist.

WCMH-TV used the WLWC call letters from its 1949 sign-on until the station was sold to Outlet Broadcasting in 1976. In the 1990s, WCMH entered into an agreement to manage the operations of WWHO in the Columbus market under a "local marketing agreement" (LMA) with Fant Broadcasting, owner of WWHO-TV. Outlet, in turn, owned 20% of Fant. Due to the success of this arrangement, WCMH's sister station WJAR in Providence, Rhode Island entered into a similar arrangement to operate Channel 28 in that market, also owned by Fant.

At about the same time, Premier Broadcasting Corporation also announced that it would be using the WLWC call letters for Columbus low-power television station W62BE. Because of the historic and brand value of the WLWC call letters in the Columbus market, Outlet arranged to have the call sign "warehoused" on Channel 28 in Providence, Rhode Island, in order to keep competitors from using them in the Columbus area. Channel 28 applied for and was assigned the WLWC call letters and has used them ever since. Premier's television station, now silent, ultimately took the call letters WLWG.

Lima, Ohio, Radio station WBKS used the WLWD call letters when it was branded "Wild 93.9." The WLWD call letters are familiar in the Lima area since the WDTN signal reaches various portions of the Lima market either over the air or through cable carriage. Today, the WLWD call letters are used by a low-power Daystar station in Springfield, Ohio, which is part of the Dayton, Ohio television market.

The WLWI call letters are used by an AM and FM radio station serving the Montgomery, Alabama radio market.

== Former Crosley assets ==
Broadcast outlets operated by Crosley Broadcasting or its successor Avco include the following. Stations are arranged in alphabetical order by state and city of license.

- (**) — indicate a station built and signed-on by Crosley/Avco.

=== Radio stations ===
AM Station	FM Station

City of license / Market	Station	Years owned	Current status
San Francisco, CA	KYA 1260	1966–1977	KSFB, owned by Relevant Radio
San Francisco, CA	KYA-FM 93.3	1966–1977	KRZZ, owned by Spanish Broadcasting System
St. Louis, MO	WRTH 590	1969–1977	KFNS, owned by Zoberist Media, LLC
New York City, NY	WINS 1010	1946–1953	Owned by Audacy, Inc.
Cincinnati, OH	WLWA 101.1**	1946–1953	Defunct; frequency now used by WIZF
Cincinnati, OH	WLW 700**	1922–1977	Owned by iHeartMedia
Cincinnati, OH	WSAI 1360	1928–1945	Owned by iHeartMedia
Columbus, OH	WLWF 96.3**	1949–1953	Defunct; frequency now used by WLVQ
Dayton, OH	WLWB 97.5**	1949–1953	Defunct; frequency now used by WTGR, Union City
San Antonio, TX	WOAI 1200	1965–1975	Owned by iHeartMedia
Washington, D.C.	WWDC-FM 101.1	1965–1975	Owned by iHeartMedia
Washington, D.C.	WWDC 1260	1965–1975	WQOF, owned by Relevant Radio

=== Television stations ===
City of license / Market	Station	Channel	Years owned	Current status
Atlanta, GA	WLWA	8/11	1953–1962	NBC affiliate, WXIA-TV, owned by Nexstar Media Group
Indianapolis, IN	WLWI**	13	1957–1974	NBC affiliate, WTHR, owned by Nexstar Media Group
Cincinnati, OH	WLWT**	4/5	1948–1976	NBC affiliate owned by Hearst Television
Columbus, OH	WLWC**	3/4	1949–1976	NBC affiliate, WCMH-TV, owned by Nexstar Media Group
Dayton, OH	WLWD**	5/2	1949–1976	NBC affiliate, WDTN, owned by Nexstar Media Group
San Antonio, TX	WOAI-TV	4	1965–1975	NBC affiliate owned by Sinclair Broadcast Group
