= The Coleman Brothers =

American gospel group

The Coleman Brothers were an American gospel group formed in Newark, New Jersey, in 1932. Influenced by family members and Southern black gospel traditions, the ensemble recorded 18 singles during the peak of their popularity in the 1940s under the leadership of singer-songwriter Lander Coleman. In their heyday, the Coleman Brothers were a pioneering presence on music radio and received extended notice when their song "Milky White Way" was covered by the Trumpeteers to huge commercial success.

== History ==
The nucleus of the Coleman Brothers came together, at least in rudimentary form, in 1932. All musicians in the group had a background rooted in spiritual and jubilee traditions, with each one singing, some independently of one another, in churches and concert programs. In addition, an earlier ensemble consisting of an older generation of Coleman family members performed throughout New Jersey under the same name between 1917 and 1925 but never recorded. The line-up was in a constant state of instability in the early years of its existence until brothers Lander (lead vocals), Russell (tenor), Wallace (baritone), Melvin (bass) and Everitte Coleman (guitar), as well as Danny Owens (second tenor), came together in 1935.

Between 1935 and 1942, the Coleman Brothers were popular figures in package tours across the American south and west, appearing recurrently with the Soul Stirrers and the Dixie Hummingbirds. The group also spent time singing on radio programs WHBI, WPAT, and WABC before receiving a vocal staff contract with CBS in New York in 1943. There, the group sponsored major companies, becoming one of the first black ensembles to do so when they promoted the Chase & Sanborn Coffee Company on national television. As the Coleman Brothers broadcast an early morning programme for CBS, their manager Milt Lasnick arranged a one-off single deal with Decca Records. The record coupled cover versions of "Low Down Chariot" and "His Eye Is on the Sparrow". More recordings were released by Manor Records, including Coleman's "Milky White Way", a song that became an enormous hit for the Trumpeteers in 1948.

The brothers became so popular that they established a business enterprise which included a record label (Coleman Records), a lodge, a hotel in Newark, and a collection of barbecue restaurants. Their label released six singles by the Coleman Brothers, among other acts, and had a national hit with the Ray-O-Vacs whose take on the song "I'll Always Be in Love with You" reached number eight on the Billboard R&B Charts. To direct the rapidly expanding venture, Melvin Coleman left the group to become the business's full-time president, and was replaced by A.J. Eldridge. By 1946, the group moved to Cincinnati to work for WLW, the same station that launched the Mills Brothers' career.

In 1951, the Coleman Brothers disbanded after recording three singles for Regal Records a year earlier. For a while, Lander Coleman managed a club in Newark before forming a new Coleman Brothers group in 1964 and recording a studio album, titled Milky White Way to capitalize on the rendition done by Elvis Presley. Coleman continued to perform with the quartet until two of its members were wounded in a robbery in 1978. The Coleman label, supervised by Melvin Coleman, was sold to Savoy Records after his death in 1959.
