= WLW (AM) =

Clear-channel news/talk radio station in Cincinnati

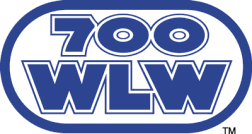

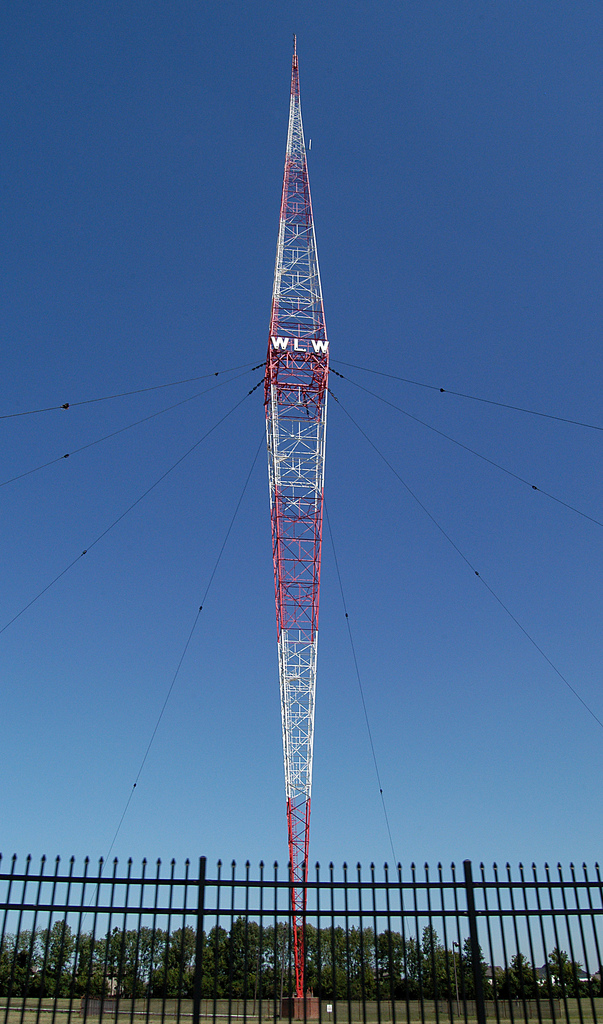
- WLW's diamond-shaped Blaw-Knox radio tower has been in use since 1934
- Cincinnati, Ohio; United States
- Broadcast area: Cincinnati metropolitan area
- Frequency: 700 kHz
- Branding: Newsradio 700 WLW

Programming
- Format: Talk radio
- Affiliations: ABC News Radio; Westwood One; Cincinnati Bearcats; Cincinnati Bengals; Cincinnati Reds

Ownership
- Owner: iHeartMedia, Inc.; (iHM Licenses, LLC)
- Sister stations: WCKY; WEBN; WKFS; WKRC; WSAI

History
- First air date: March 23, 1922
- Former frequencies: 833 kHz (1922–1923); 970 kHz (1923–1924); 710 kHz (1924–1927)

Technical information
- Licensing authority: FCC
- Facility ID: 29733
- Class: A
- Power: 50,000 watts unlimited
- Transmitter coordinates: 39°21′11″N 84°19′30″W (main transmitter); 39°21′11″N 84°19′44″W (auxiliary transmitter)
- Translator: 94.5 W233BG (Cincinnati)

Links
- Public license information: Public file; LMS
- Webcast: Listen live (via iHeartRadio)
- Website: 700wlw.iheart.com

WLW (700 AM) is a commercial news/talk radio station licensed to Cincinnati, Ohio. Owned by iHeartMedia, WLW is a clear-channel station, often identifying itself as "The Big One". Its studios are located in Sycamore Township (with a Cincinnati address). WLW is a primary entry point station in the Emergency Alert System for Southwest Ohio, Kentucky and Eastern Indiana. Besides its main analog transmission, WLW is simulcast over low-power translator W233BG (94.5 FM) and on a digital subchannel of WKFS, and available online via iHeartRadio.

WLW operates with 50,000 watts around the clock. The transmitter site in nearby Mason features a distinctive diamond-shaped Blaw-Knox tower. Its daytime signal provides at least secondary coverage to almost all of Ohio and Indiana, and much of central Kentucky. WLW is heard at city-grade strength as far as Indianapolis, Indiana; Lexington, Kentucky; and Columbus, Ohio, with secondary coverage as far as Louisville and the outer suburbs of Cleveland and Detroit. At night, with a good radio, it can be heard in much of North America.

Launched by industrialist Powel Crosley Jr., WLW became the flagship station of the Crosley Broadcasting Corporation, later a part of Avco. One of four charter affiliates of the Mutual Broadcasting System, WLW holds the distinction of being the only AM radio station authorized by the Federal Communications Commission (FCC) to broadcast with a power of 500,000 watts, which happened in the 1930s. Avco later launching television adjunct WLW-T (channel 5), which itself became the core of a regional television station network bearing the "WLW" name. The breakup of Avco resulted in WLW having a succession of owners before becoming the flagship of Jacor in the mid-1980s; under Jacor ownership, WLW adopted an aggressive, talk lineup programmed by Randy Michaels, becoming the home of Mike McConnell, Gary Burbank and Bill Cunningham. Since 1999, WLW has been owned by Clear Channel Communications, later renamed iHeartMedia.

== History ==
=== Origin ===
WLW was the outgrowth of an interest in radio by Powel Crosley Jr., although information about his earliest activities is limited. Crosley recounted that his introduction to radio occurred on February 22, 1921, when he took his son to the local Precision Equipment Company store to investigate purchasing a receiver. He was shocked to find that a high-end receiver would cost US$135 (equivalent to $2436.8 in 2025), and after assembling his own receiver from parts, he realized that commercial mass production could be done at much lower prices. Starting with individual parts, then moving on to complete receivers, in the 1920s the Crosley Radio Corporation was a leading manufacturer of inexpensive sets, and Powel Crosley became known as "the Henry Ford of radio".

Crosley was also an early experimenter with making radio transmissions. Most accounts say he began in July 1921, using a 20-watt set located in an upstairs billiard table room, repeatedly playing a phonograph record of "Song of India", while asking local amateur radio enthusiasts to call if they heard his signals. In 1921, the Crosley Manufacturing Company was issued two radio station licenses: one for a standard amateur station, 8CR, located at 5723 Davey Avenue, (Note: The 8 in 8CR's call sign indicated that the station was located in the eighth Radio Inspection district. The fact that the "C" fell in the range A-W meant that the station was operating under a standard amateur station license.) which was Crosley's College Hill home, and the other for an Experimental station, 8XAA, located at the company's Blue Rock Street factory building in Northside. (Note: The "X" in 8XAA's call sign indicated that the station was operating under an Experimental license.)

=== WLW ===
Initially there were no formal standards for radio stations making broadcasts for the general public, and a variety of stations, most operating under Experimental or Amateur station licenses, conducted broadcasts on a regular schedule. On December 1, 1921, the U.S. Department of Commerce, which regulated radio at this time, adopted the first regulation formally establishing a broadcasting station category, which set aside the wavelength of 360 meters (833 kHz) for entertainment broadcasts, and 485 meters (619 kHz) for market and weather reports.

The Precision Equipment Company was the first in Cincinnati to receive one of the new broadcasting station licenses, when its experimental station, 8XB, was relicensed as WMH on December 30, 1921. The Crosley Manufacturing Company also applied for one of the new licenses, which was granted on March 2, 1922, for operation on the 360-meter "entertainment" wavelength, and issued the randomly assigned call letters of WLW.

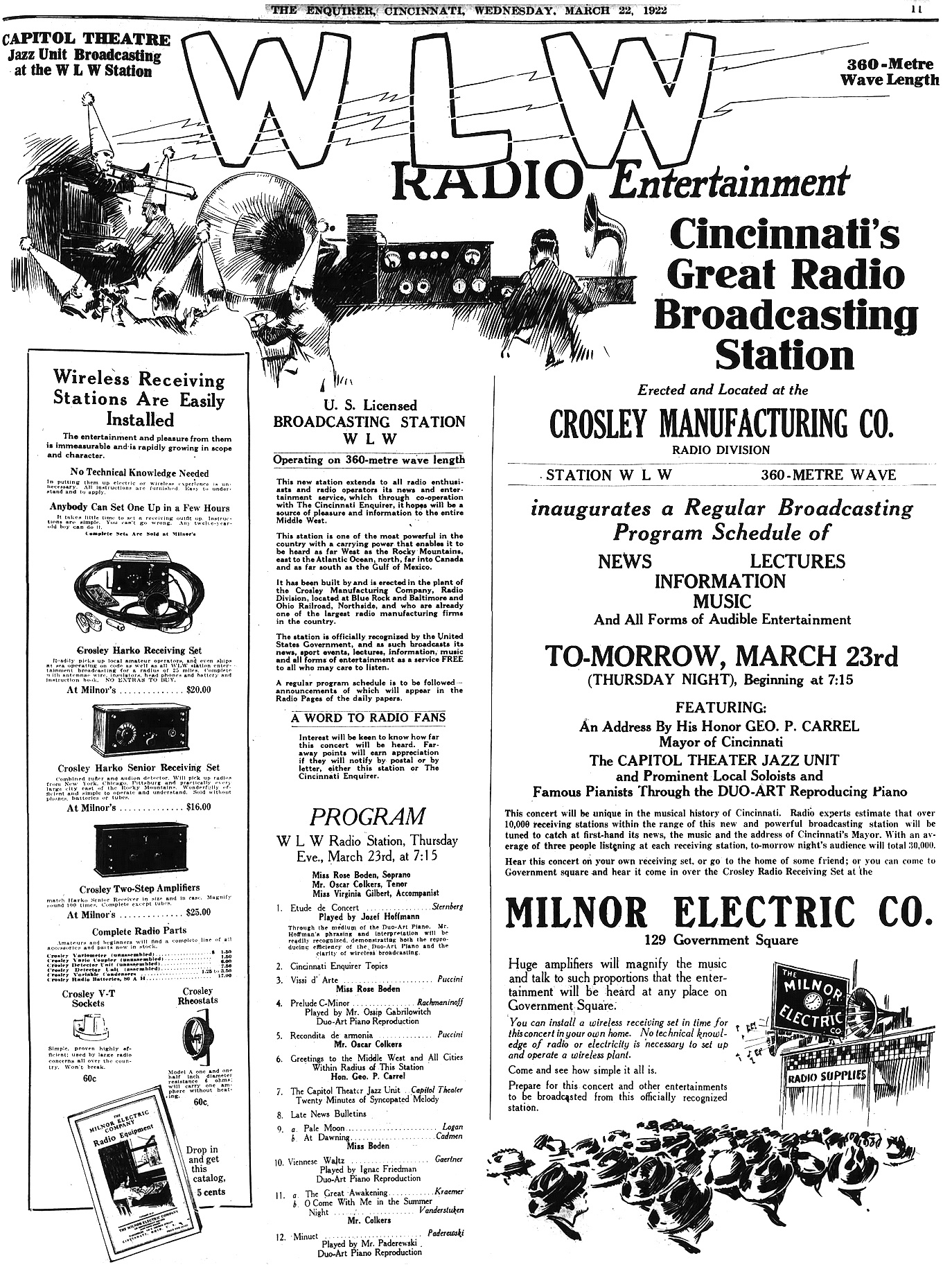
WLW held its debut broadcast on March 23, 1922. Crosley brand "Harko" receivers were available for purchase to listen to the programs.

WLW made its debut broadcast on March 23, 1922, beginning at 7:15 pm. Station studios and transmitter were located at the Blue Rock Street building. Although the transmitter power was a fairly modest 50 watts, station publicity boldly predicted that although previously "only the smaller type of sending apparatus has been employed in Cincinnati", "The equipment of the Crosley Manufacturing Company is of such great power that the concert emanating from Cincinnati will be heard as far as a distant point in Canada; as far east as the Atlantic Ocean; west as far as the Rocky Mountains, and south to the southernmost tip of the Florida Keys, and possibly to ships in the Gulf of Mexico?" and that "This inaugural concert will put Cincinnati 'on the map' of the radio world."

The single shared entertainment wavelength of 360 meters meant that stations within a given region had to make timesharing agreements to assign operating timeslots. On August 7, 1922, WLW's programs were scheduled from 1:00 p.m. to 3:00 pm, while WMH's ran from 8:15 p.m. to 10:00 pm. Crosley was a fanatic about the new broadcasting technology, and continually increased his station's capability. The power increased to 500 watts in September 1922, and to 1,000 watts in May 1924.

In 1923, Crosley bought the Precision Equipment Company, and in January shut down WMH's operations. Precision, which held the rights to use the valuable Armstrong regeneration patent, was technically the surviving company in the merger, and was subsequently renamed the Crosley Radio Company.

In May 1923, the Department of Commerce set aside a band of "Class B" frequencies reserved for stations that had quality equipment and programming, and the Cincinnati region was assigned exclusive use of 970 kHz. In the summer WLW began operating on this new frequency, sharing time with another Cincinnati station, WSAI. In May 1924, a third Class B station was established in Cincinnati, WFBW (now WKRC), which the next month revived the WMH call letters. WLW was unhappy with having to split time with two other stations, so in June 1924, government regulators moved WLW to 710 kHz, sharing time with WBAV (now WTVN) in Columbus.

At the Third National Radio Conference, held in October 1924, the Radio Corporation of America's (RCA) vice president and general manager, David Sarnoff, announced that his company planned to embark on the construction of a 50,000-watt station for New York City. At this time 1,000 watts was the maximum permitted, so this brought up fears by smaller stations that a group of powerful stations would monopolize the airwaves. However, Powel Crosley fully endorsed the idea, stating: "Our idea of the solution to the static problem is increase in power. We talk today of 5,000 watts being superpower, when we all know that five years from now certain broadcasting stations will be using from 50 to 200 kilowatts. When that day comes, there will be no more static."

In late 1924, Western Electric began selling radio transmitters capable of operating at 5,000 watts, but the Commerce Department, wary of the high-powered sets overwhelming local receivers, did not immediately allow stations to use the full power. Instead stations could start operating with up to 1,500 watts, then, only if approved by the region's Radio Supervisor, increase powers in successive 500-watt steps, while ensuring that it was not causing excessive interference. WLW ordered one of the 5,000-watt-capable Western Electric transmitters, originally hoping to have it in operation by the end of December. In addition, a new remote transmitter site was constructed at Harrison, Ohio, located away from the city to limit the possibility of the station's signals overwhelming local receivers. On January 27, 1925, WLW began using its 5,000-watt-capable transmitter, although not yet at full power.

The Commerce Department's cautious approach toward power increases was based on the assumption that station transmitters were located in heavily populated areas. However, in May 1925, it recognized that WLW's Harrison and WSAI's Mason, Ohio, transmitter sites were both far enough from population centers that they could immediately begin operating as the first two stations in the nation transmitting with the full 5,000 watts. A Cincinnati Post writer investigated the effect of WSAI and WLW's May 11 introduction of the use of 5,000 watts, and found that despite claims that their "superpower broadcasting" would eliminate static within 500 miles, it was only "a start in the right direction". Listeners reported that the stations now sounded about twice as strong, and also noted that KDKA in Pittsburgh's 10,000 watts was even better.

Shortly after WLW began operating with 5,000 watts, the major radio manufacturers began work on producing more powerful transmitters. Development was led by General Electric, and in July 1925 that company's WGY in Schenectady, New York began conducting tests of a 50,000-watt transmitter, which began regular usage later that year.

=== "The Nation's Station" ===
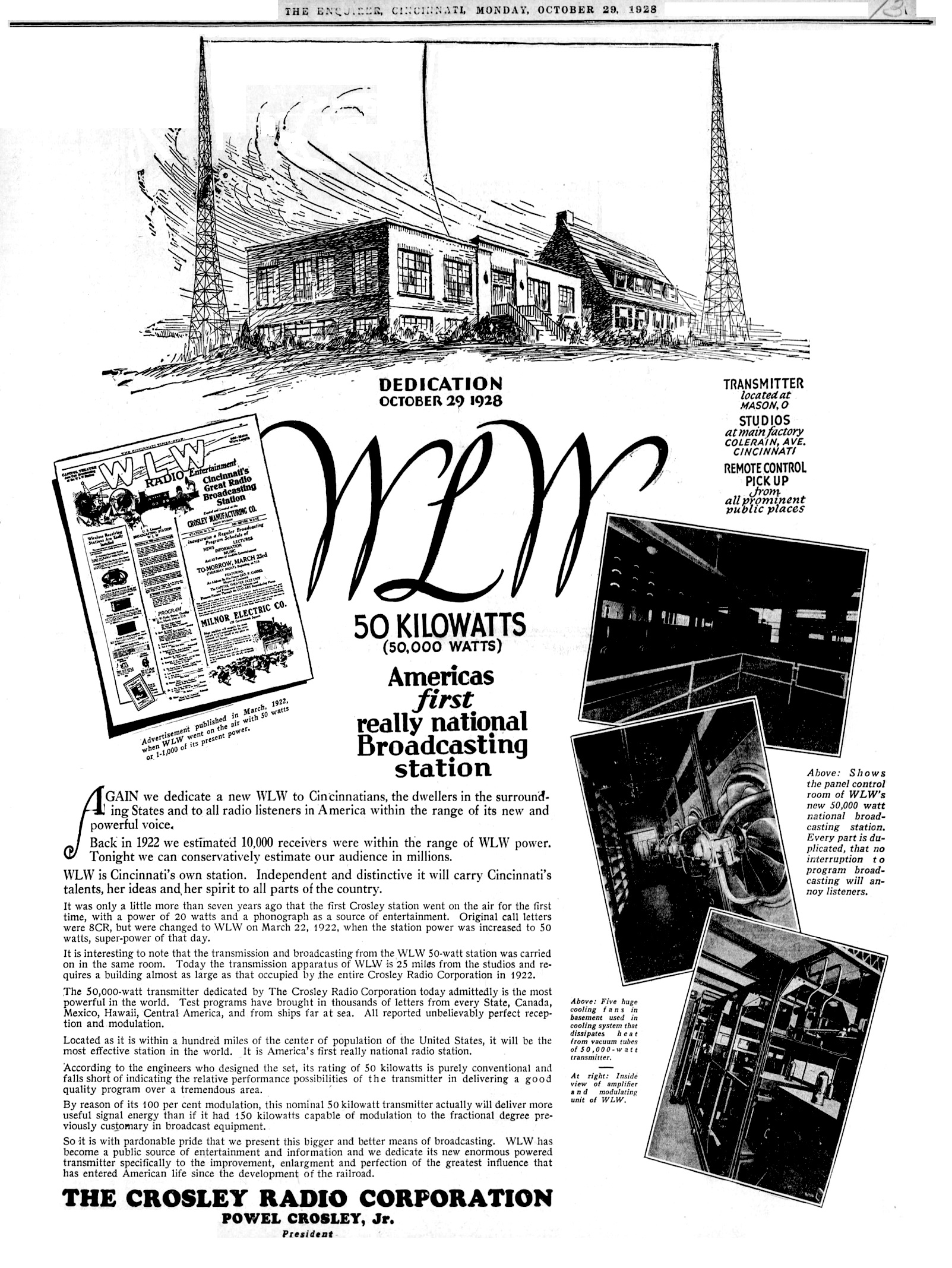
In October 1928, WLW became the fourth station in the United States to operate with 50,000 watts.

By the summer of 1928, stations WGY, WEAF and KDKA were broadcasting with 50,000 watts, and WLW was making plans to join them.

In May, Crosley purchased WSAI, and began to consolidate the two station's operations. This included WLW moving its transmitter site from Harrison to sharing WSAI's facility at Mason. There is where WLW's 50,000-watt Western Electric transmitter would be installed, with its completion initially hoped to be by September. It was actually October 29, 1928, when WLW became the fourth member of the select group of U.S. stations operating with 50,000 watts. However, at the dedication ceremonies the station proclaimed that, because WLW was more centrally located than the other 50,000 watt stations, it was "America's first really national Broadcasting station", with a signal that "cut through static like a knife". In early 1929, Crosley company advertising began referring to WLW using the slogan "The Nation's Station". The station even branched out into international service, including a weekly program in Spanish which was intended for listeners in Cuba.

In 1926, there had been a temporary suspension of government regulation of radio due to a court ruling that the Commerce Department had overstepped its legal authority. This eventually resulted in the formation of the Federal Radio Commission (FRC), which as part of its re-establishment of control moved WLW to 700 kHz in June 1927, the frequency on which it has operated ever since. In November 1928, under the provisions of the FRC's General Order 40, 700 kHz was one of 40 frequencies designated as "clear channels", and WLW was assigned exclusive use of this frequency within the United States and Canada.

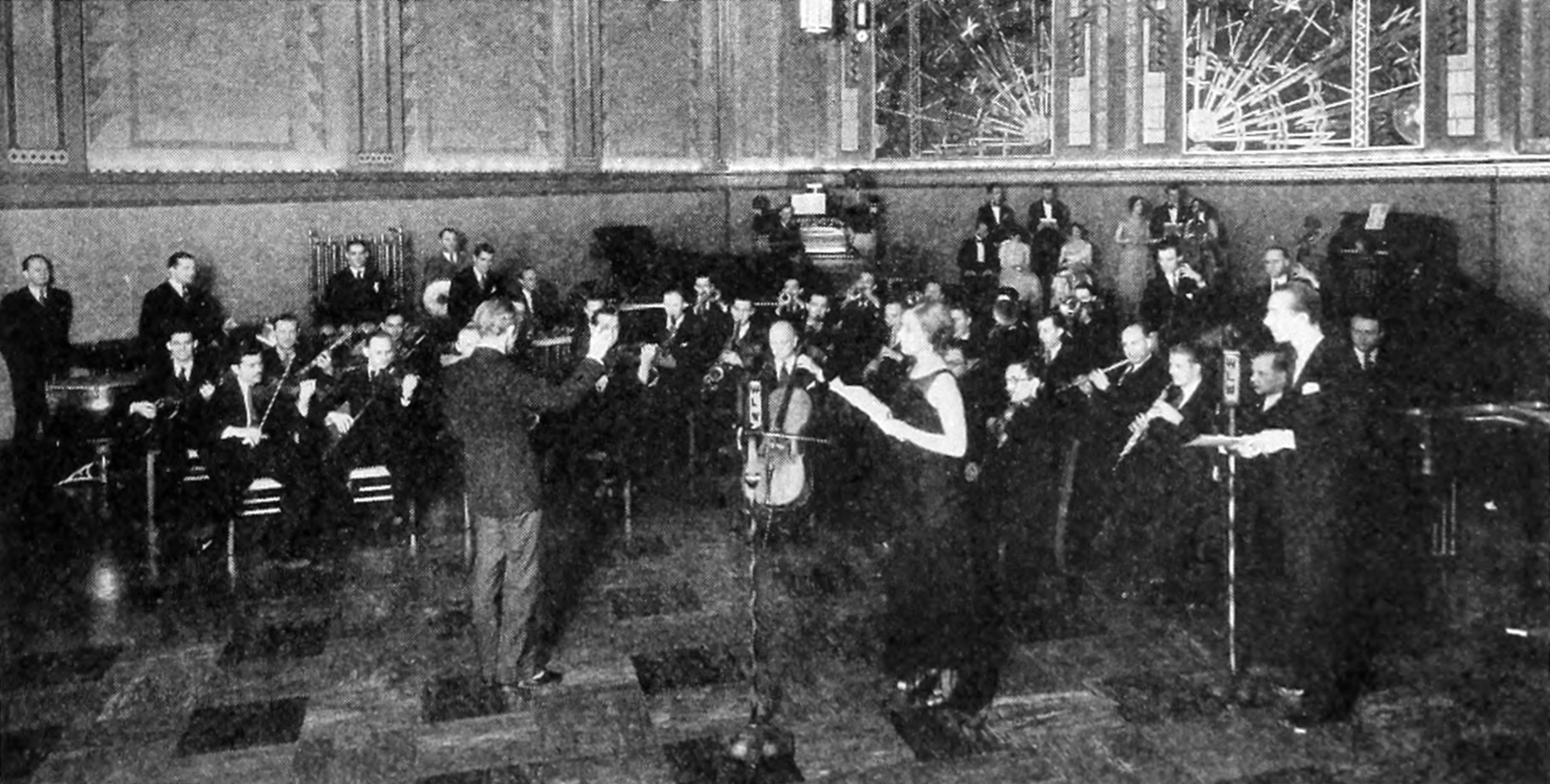
One of the five new studios comprising the eighth floor of the new Crosley Radio Company building (1930)

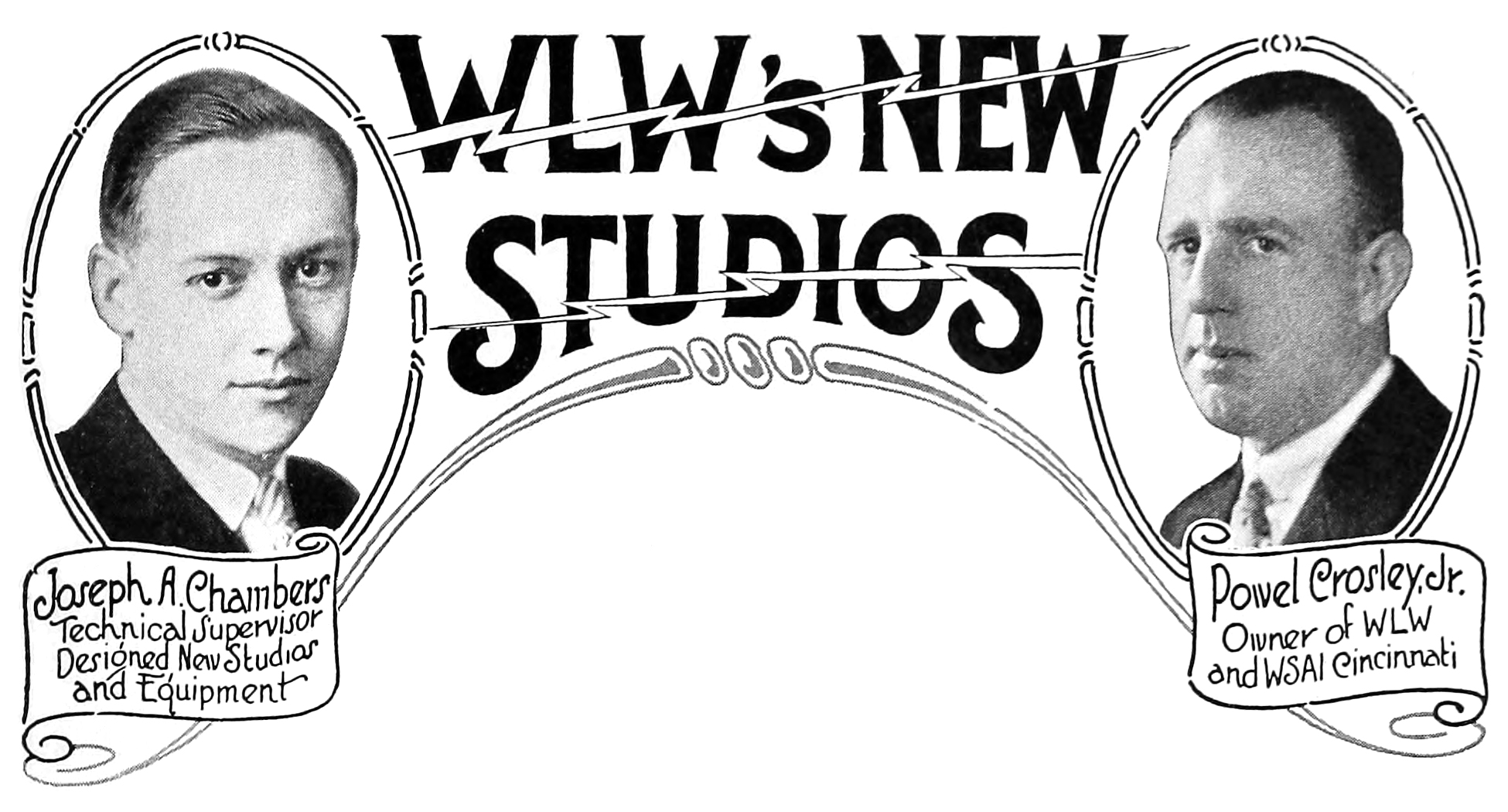
A feature story about WLW's new studios incorporated photographs of Joseph A. Chambers, technical supervisor and designer of the new facilities, and Powel Crosley Jr., owner of WLW and WSAI (1930)

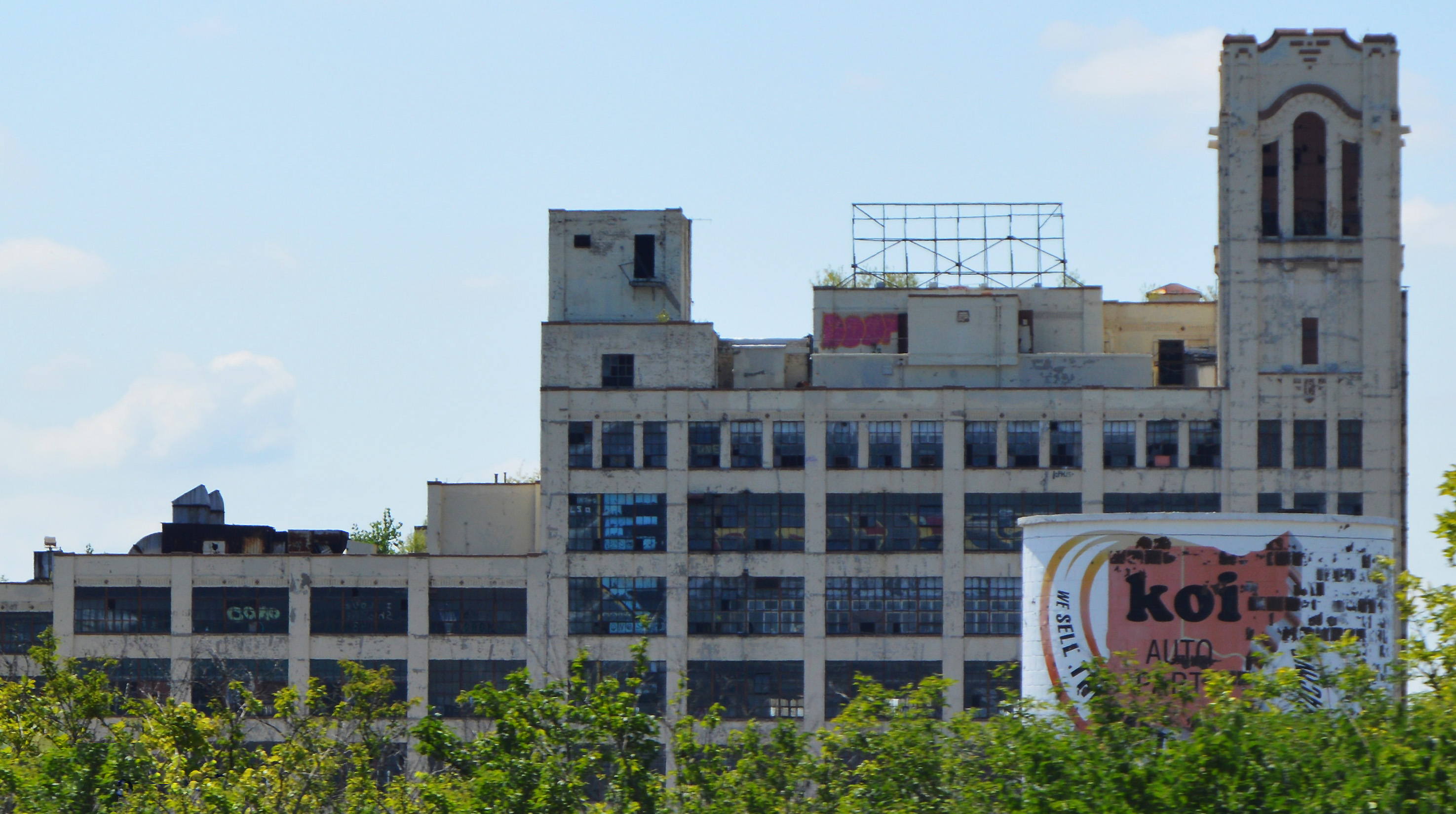
The Crosley Building in Camp Washington, Cincinnati, built in 1930, is listed on the National Register of Historic Places.

At 50 kilowatts, WLW was heard easily over a wide area from New York to Florida, but Crosley still was not satisfied. In early 1933, it was announced that RCA had been awarded a contract to oversee the construction of a 500,000-watt transmitter, "the largest broadcasting transmitter in the world", although initially it would only be operated during the hours of 1 to 6 am.

=== 500,000-watt "superpower" operation ===
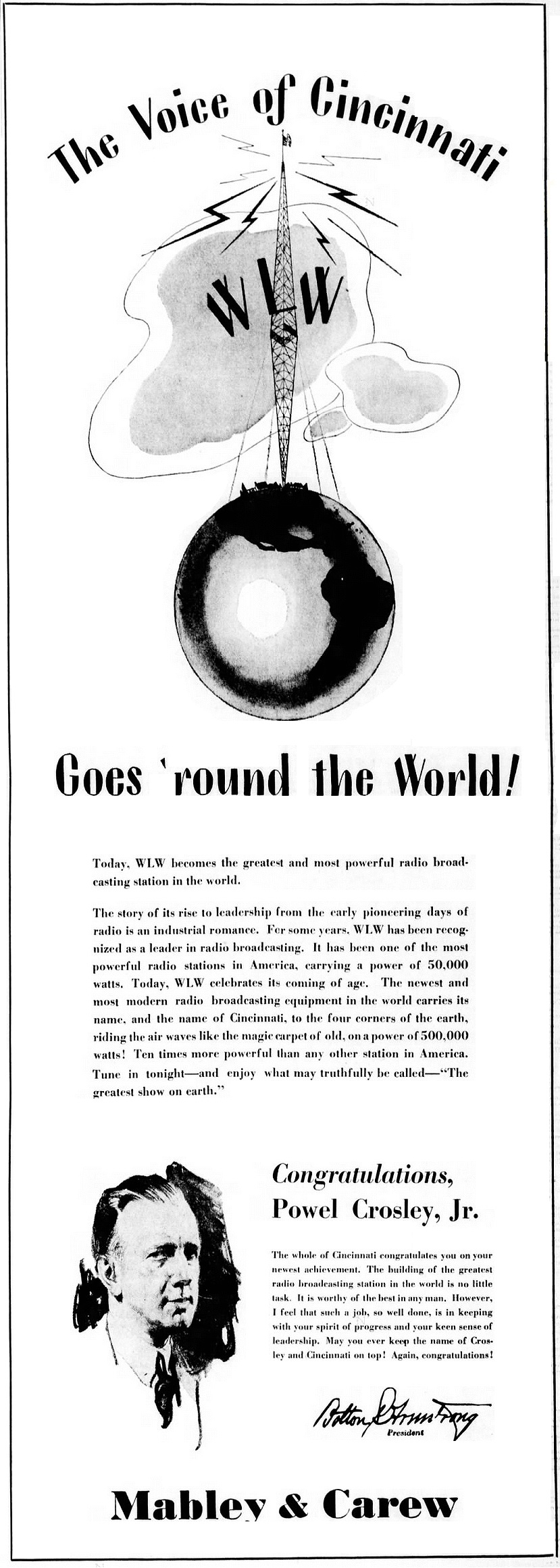
WLW debuted its 500,000 watt transmitter on May 2, 1934.

Crosley obtained a construction permit from the Federal Radio Commission (FRC) for the addition of a 500-kilowatt transmitter amplifier at the Mason complex, and spent some $500,000 ($12.4 million in 2025) constructing the equipment and facilities for the new amplifier and installation of an 800-foot (240-meter) tall antenna.

In January 1934, WLW began broadcasting with 500,000 watts after midnight under the experimental call sign W8XO. In April 1934, the station was authorized to operate at 500,000 watts during regular hours using the WLW call letters. On May 2, 1934, President Franklin D. Roosevelt ceremonially pressed the same golden telegraph key that Wilson had used to open the Panama Canal, officially launching WLW's 500-kilowatt signal.

As the first station in the world to broadcast at this strength, WLW received numerous complaints from around the United States and Canada that it was interfering with other stations, most notably from CFRB, then on 690 kHz, in Toronto, Ontario. In December 1934, WLW was instructed to cut back to 50 kilowatts at night until it had eliminated the interference. The station began construction of two shorter towers 1,850 feet (560 m) southwest from the main tower to create a directional antenna, which successfully reduced the signal broadcast towards Canada. With these antenna towers in place, full-time broadcasting at 500 kilowatts resumed in early 1935. However, WLW was continuing to operate under special temporary authority that had to be renewed every six months; each renewal brought complaints about interference, and undue domination of the market by the high-powered station.

In September 1934, WLW was one of the founding members of the Mutual Broadcasting System, although it withdrew as a primary participant and became a regular affiliate two years later. The station found that with its tremendous signal it could independently compete with the national radio networks, with a rate card comparable to what the major networks charged. One result was that by 1936, there was increasing pressure on the FCC to start allowing additional clear channel stations to operate with 500,000 watts, and in October there were a reported 14 outstanding applicants to join the "superpower" ranks.

In 1928, the FRC's General Order 40 had established the basic structure of the AM broadcast band in the United States, grouping transmitting frequencies into three major categories: "local", limited to 100 watts, "regional", with up to 1,000 watts, and "clear", with an unspecified limit that was generally capped at 50,000 watts the next month by General Order 42. Over time, the maximum daytime powers were increased to 250 watts for local stations, and 5,000 watts for regional ones.

In June 1938, the FCC held a series of hearings on the future of the AM band, including power levels. An important factor in their deliberations was the "Wheeler resolution". On June 13, 1938, the U.S. Senate adopted resolution 294, sponsored by Burton K. Wheeler (D-Montana), which stated that it was the "sense of the Senate... that the Federal Communications Commission should not adopt or promulgate rules to permit or otherwise allow any station operating on a frequency in the standard broadcast band (550 to 1600 kilocycles) to operate on a regular or other basis with power in excess of 50 kilowatts". Wheeler, an avid anti-monopolist who wanted to protect the smaller stations, was also concerned that domination of the airwaves by high-powered stations could lead to a dictator like Mussolini, Hitler or Stalin, who had each used control of radio to support their rise to power.

This resolution, unlike a law, was not binding on the FCC; however it was seen as having an important influence on the outcome of its hearings. In early 1939, the FCC announced its new regulations, which narrowed the differences between low and high-powered stations. Local stations could now use up to 250 watts at night, and regional 5,000 watts. On the other hand, in language that largely echoed the financial arguments of the Wheeler resolution, clear channel stations were still limited to 50,000 watts, and WLW's temporary authorization to use 500,000 watts, except experimentally during early morning hours, was terminated.

=== Return to 50,000 watts ===
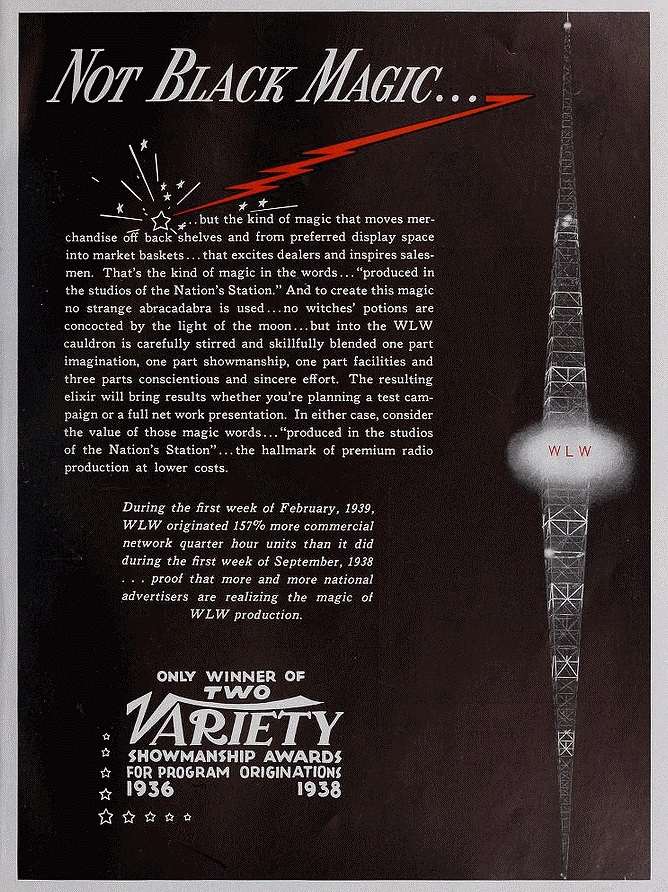
Promotional advertisement (1939)

Beginning in 1939, WLW used the overnight hours to transmit READO radiofax newspapers. However, the system was unable to compete with standard newspaper delivery, and was shut down a few years later. On March 1, 1939, WLW resumed operations at 50,000 watts. The station had unsuccessfully attempted to reverse the decision in the courts, and now had to shut down the huge amplifiers, except for brief, experimental night periods as W8XO. Because of the impending war, and the possible need for national broadcasting in an emergency, the W8XO experimental license for 500 kilowatts remained in effect until December 29, 1942.

In the 1930s, WLW occupied the entire 48th floor of Carew Tower. In 1942, the station moved its studios into the Crosley Square building, a converted Elks Lodge No. 5 in downtown Cincinnati. WLW's sister television station, WLWT (then branded WLW-T), was founded in the same building. In 1955, WLW and WLWT became the first radio and television station to own a weather radar.

A major promotion of the station in the 1940s was the Boone County Jamboree. A 1942 advertisement in the trade publication Billboard noted: "WLW Boone County Jamboree acts played to 169,406 persons, July 4 to October 4. An all time record of 63 bookings in seven States. New attendance records established at 14 events.". The Jamboree featured a number of country music performers who later became iconic and a few who entered the Country Music Hall of Fame. Among these were Grandpa Jones, Merle Travis and The Delmore Brothers. Other significant artists who worked there were Joe Maphis, Hank Penny, Smiley Burnette, Lazy Jim Day and Shug Fisher.

The August 1941 adoption of the Federal Communications Commission's "duopoly" rule restricted licensees from operating more than one radio station in a given market. At this time the Crosley Corporation owned both WLW and WSAI, so to conform with the new regulation in 1944 WSAI was sold to Marshall Field. The next year Crosley sold WLW to the Aviation Corporation of the Americas (Avco), earning a handsome return on his original investment of a quarter-century earlier. The Crosley name was so well respected that Avco retained it as the name of its broadcast division until 1968.

From the 1950s until the 1970s, broadcasts for WLW were moved across Elm street to the COMEX building, where people could watch radio broadcasts from the sidewalk through plate glass windows.

By 1962, there were only 13 unduplicated clear channel frequencies left in the United States, and the FCC was investigating whether to "break up" these remaining frequencies by adding secondary stations. In response the U.S. House of Representatives passed House Resolution 714, which gave support to having the frequencies remain assigned exclusively to a single station, and a number of the stations, calling themselves the "Clear Channel Broadcasting Service", applied for higher powers. This included WLW, which submitted an application to operate with 750 kilowatts. However, the FCC denied these applications and went ahead with the additional stations, located mostly in under-served western states. Despite no longer being the sole occupant of 700 kHz, WLW's signal still sometimes spanned impressive distances, and in 1985 overnight host Dale Sommers received a call from a listener in Hawaii. Reception at the United States Air Force's Thule Air Base in Greenland (4,235 km) has been reported as sufficiently good for routine listening with an ordinary commercial AM-FM radio receiver at night during the Arctic winter.

Avco began exiting broadcasting in 1975. WLW was one of the last properties to be sold in 1976. From that point until the 1990s, WLW had different owners, including Queen City Communications, Mariner Communications, Seven Hills Broadcasting and Jacor Communications, before Jacor merged with Clear Channel Communications (now iHeartMedia). The Clear Channel merger made WLW a sister station to Cincinnati's other 50,000-watt "flamethrower", WCKY. The latter station had been licensed to Covington, Kentucky (hence its callsign), for much of the early part of its history, a quirk that allowed it to get a clear-channel designation despite WLW's presence.

From the late 1970s to 1989, WLW's studios were located at 3 East 4th Street in downtown Cincinnati. From 1989 to 2005, WLW was located in Mt. Adams, a trendy neighborhood overlooking downtown. The address remained 1111 St. Gregory Street. WLW was originally on the fourth floor, where it shared studios with sister station WEBN. In 1990, the station began broadcasting in C-QUAM AM stereo. In 1992, as Jacor started to consolidate stations, the fifth floor was taken over by the human resources and traffic departments, along with new studios for 550 WLWA, formerly WKRC. In 1995, Jacor moved all of its stations into the Mt. Adams facility, leasing the entire building. In February 1999, WLW stopped broadcasting in AM stereo.

A Bell 47G traffic helicopter leased by the station was severely damaged in an emergency landing at Maketewah Country Club on May 20, 1982, that injured the pilot and reporter Bill Beahr.

Along with other Clear Channel talk stations, WLW switched from ABC News Radio to Fox News Radio. However, on June 26, 2006, a realignment of network affiliations by Clear Channel's Cincinnati AM stations reunited WLW with ABC News Radio. (WKRC picked up Fox News Radio, while WCKY took CBS Radio). Not included in the rearrangement was ABC Radio commentator Paul Harvey. WLW continued to carry Harvey's commentaries through all the changes, although after extended absences, Harvey was dropped by WLW in April 2008.

WLW eventually stopped calling itself "The Nation's Station" and adopted the slogan "The Big One". For a time in the early 1960s, it also called itself the "World's Highest Fidelity Radio Station".

Although Crosley also owned the Cincinnati Reds along with WLW from 1934 to 1945, WLW did not become the Reds' flagship station until 1969, a status it has retained ever since. Over the years, WLW has also been the flagship for Cincinnati Bengals football, University of Cincinnati football and basketball, Xavier University basketball, and the games of the Cincinnati Royals (now the Sacramento Kings) of the National Basketball Association.

In 2013, WLW purchased an FM translator from Northern Kentucky University to be used for simulcasting, and moved it to Port Union, Ohio. The station is W233BG on 94.5, operating at 120 watts. This would later be moved to Cincinnati, drop power to 99 watts, and switch to repeating WKFS-HD2.

Until 2015, WLW was also associated with Raycom Media's WXIX-TV.

=== XM Radio simulcast ===
From March 1, 2006, to March 6, 2009, WLW was simulcast on XM Satellite Radio channel 173, expanding the station coverage to the entire continental United States. Excluded from the simulcast was Cincinnati Bengals play-by-play coverage, as the station did not own the national rights. However, college sport play-by-play from the Xavier Musketeers and the Cincinnati Bearcats was carried, as were Cincinnati Reds games (XM had purchased the rights to Major League Baseball separately). The station was placed on the satellites by then Clear Channel programming executive Sean Compton (brother of WLW overnight personality Steve Sommers, whose program continues to be broadcast on the platform), who claimed WLW was his favorite radio station. Compton left the company in 2008 for the Tribune Company, and shortly thereafter WLW was dropped from XM.

== Shortwave operations ==
In 1925, Crosley received a license for an experimental shortwave station, 8XAL (W8XAL after 1928). In August 1926, the company announced that it was planning to establish a shortwave link to relay programs from Cincinnati for retransmission by a newly acquired station, WARC, located near Boston, Massachusetts, however this link was never implemented.

In 1926, 8XAL was on air with 100 watts, which increased to 10,000 watts in 1931. During 1931, W8XAL simulcast WLW's programming, e.g. its Ohio School of the Air educational series. In 1940, the station was relicensed as a commercial station, with the callsign WLWO. In early 1941, it was operating with 75 kilowatts, with a program service particularly aimed at South America, and was known as "The Inter-Nation Station".

The station transmitted on 5.69 MHz from 1924 to 1929 and 6.06 MHz (June 1929 – November 1, 1942). In 1941, operations were described as "the only international station in the United States authorized to operate on each of the six short-wave bands with unlimited frequencies and unlimited time. WLWO's assigned frequencies are: 6.08, 9.59, 11.71, 15.25, 17.80, and 21.65 megs", with programs in English, Spanish and Portuguese. In 1943, Crosley engineers built the U.S. government's Bethany shortwave transmitter site, which was later taken over by the Voice of America.

== Mason, Ohio transmitter site ==
WLW's distinctive diamond-shaped antenna is featured on the official seal of the city of Mason. Designed and erected by Blaw-Knox Tower company in 1934, it was the second of its type to be built, after WSM's in Nashville, Tennessee, and is one of eight still operational in the United States.

WLW's 500,000-watt "RCA 1" transmitter was in operation between 1934 and 1939, and was the highest power ever used in the United States for public, domestic radio broadcasting. It was designed as an amplifier of the regular 50 kW transmitter. It operated in class C with high-level plate modulation, and required two dedicated 33 kilovolt electrical substation lines and a large cooling pond complete with spray fountains. It operated with a power input of about 750 kW (plus another 400 kW of audio for the modulator) to produce 500 kW. Even after 1939, when regular WLW programming was prohibited from operating with more than 50,000 watts, the station continued post-midnight high-powered operation as experimental station W8XO, which helped to greatly improve the RCA 1 transmitter's power and reliability. By the end of World War II, it was capable of producing one million watts, and it "loafed along" at 600 kW.

WLW's 500,000-watt authorization included the requirement that the station limit its nighttime skywave signal toward Canada to the equivalent of 50,000 watts, which led to the construction of two shorter towers, electrically a quarter wavelength in height and separated by a half wavelength, that were located 1,850 feet (560 m) southwest of the main tower. The two shorter towers were fed using trolley car wire to produce an 85 kW signal at 96 degrees out-of-phase with the principal signal, which produced a null in the opposite direction from the main tower.

Many reports have surfaced over the years, from those who lived near the 500-kilowatt transmitter, of power fluctuations. Residents would see their lights flicker in time to the modulation peaks of the transmitter. It was widely reported that the signal was so overpowering that some people picked up WLW radio on the metal coils of mattresses and boxed bedsprings, but those reports have been assessed as possible urban legends. Arcing often occurred near the transmission site.

Even though WLW was now using ten times the power, listeners subjectively said it only sounded two or three times louder than before. One important factor affecting long-distance nighttime coverage was that the power upgrade included a switch from a horizontal "flattop" antenna to a vertical tower, which significantly helped the local "groundwave" coverage, at the expense of reducing the increase in distant "skywave" signals. Even so, one listener remembered being able to easily pick up WLW's nighttime signal 1,100 miles (1,800 km) away in Denver, Colorado. Another issue was that some of the earliest towers like WLW's were being built too tall, which at night caused cancellation issues where the groundwave and skywave signals interfered with each other causing excessive fading. Because of this, WLW's tower, originally at 831 feet (253 m), was reduced to 747 feet (228 m).

In October 1940 a suspicious fire broke out in the WLWO tuning house, which led to an increase in security, and in early 1941, it was reported that "Today you would have little chance of getting close enough to the equipment to do any damage, for out at Mason, Ohio, where the transmitters of WLW and WLWO are located, a special guardhouse seventy-five feet (23 meters) high has been built, a high metal fence encloses the grounds which are patrolled by a staff of 12 guards 24 hours out of each day, and a battery of floodlights illuminates every foot of the grounds day and night."

The station's original 50 kW 1927 Western Electric 7a transmitter was reactivated on the night of December 31, 1999, when it was powered up and used from 10:45 p.m. until 12:15 a.m. at the start of the next year. Chief Engineer Paul Jellison replaced a bad vacuum tube, and successfully operated the water-cooled equipment, which he noted was quieter than the newer transmitters cooled by air blowers. The transmitter output was fed through a modern Orban 9100 audio processor, and Jellison reported that it "sounded fine and the news department mentioned the fact that we were operating on it in their news casts".

== Former on-air staff ==
The station claims many well-known alumni, including: Jack Berch, Mary Jane Croft, Merle Travis, Doris Day, Rosemary Clooney, Ruth Lyons, Bob Braun, Wally Phillips, Jean Shepherd, Frazier Thomas, Nick Young, NBC sportscasters Cris Collinsworth and Al Michaels, "Sportstalk" host Bob Trumpy, Dale Sommers (better known as the "Truckin' Bozo" and whose son Steve Sommers continued to hold the overnight slot until he was fired in late 2020), J. R. Gach, Gary Burbank (comedy talk host, impressionist, and creator of the nationally syndicated Earl Pitts monologues), former program director and personality Darryl Parks and former Clear Channel radio CEO Randy Michaels. Rod Serling, the creator of the classic TV series The Twilight Zone, worked for WLW from 1947 to 1948 producing historical documentaries, community profiles and commercials, before leaving to pursue other opportunities in the broadcasting industry. Bill Nimmo, who later served as Johnny Carson's sidekick on the show Who Do You Trust? and its predecessor Do You Trust Your Wife?, also worked at WLW beginning in 1947.

== See also ==
- List of initial AM-band station grants in the United States
- List of three-letter broadcast call signs in the United States
