= Ruth Lyons (broadcaster) =

American broadcaster

- Ruth Lyons
- Born: Ruth Evelyn Reeves; October 4, 1905; Cincinnati, Ohio
- Died: November 7, 1988 (aged 83); Cincinnati, Ohio
- Education: University of Cincinnati; College of Music of Cincinnati
- Presenting career
- Stations: WKRC; WSAI; WLW; WLWT

Ruth Lyons (born Ruth Evelyn Reeves October 4, 1905, died November 7, 1988) was a pioneer radio and television broadcaster in Cincinnati, Ohio. It is said Ruth Lyons invented the daytime TV talk show. Like Arthur Godfrey and others of the era, Lyons built a TV empire.

== Early years ==
Ruth Evelyn Reeves was born in Cincinnati, the older daughter of Margaret Keturah Henry and Samuel Spencer Reeves. Her father was a travel agent who taught music at the University of Cincinnati in the evenings; her mother was also a musician. It was a close-knit family with other family members living in the immediate neighborhood. The Reeves family was a religious one; many of their activities were based at the local Presbyterian church. The women of the family had both strong faith and strong determination to provide help wherever it was needed. Grandmother Reeves was a great influence on her granddaughter; she began her household duties early and when they were completed, she went into the neighborhood to do good deeds. She was a well-read woman with strong opinions and was unafraid to voice them. Lyons's mother always reminded her daughter to do her best at everything she did. The family considered books and reading, as well as music, to be as necessary to living as food, clothing and shelter.

Lyons's first public performance was in a grammar school play. Her mother was embarrassed when her daughter misspoke her lines and there was laughter, but Lyons was glad she had made everyone laugh. By age twelve, she was interested enough in performing to write and produce her own musical. As a young girl during World War I, Lyons was involved in fund-raising activities for the Red Cross and worked with her minister to help entertain patients at local hospitals.

When she entered East High School, Lyons's years there were a flurry of activities. She edited the school yearbook, wrote and composed a school musical, accompanied the Dance Club on piano and was president of the Kalidasa Club. During her freshman year at the University of Cincinnati, she wrote the school musical, joined Delta Delta Delta sorority and was in charge of the humor section of the college yearbook. Though her parents wanted her to complete college and become a teacher, Lyons was aware of the financial toll her college tuition was taking on the family. She left her college studies and devoted more time to her music, studying piano at the College of Music of Cincinnati and had a job selling sheet music.

== Radio ==
=== WKRC ===
Lyons had been interested in radio as a high school student. Her radio career began with a one-shot appearance as an accompanist for a singer on WMH in 1925, and a regular post as pianist on WSAI beginning in 1925. She went to work full-time at WKRC in 1928; working as a radio show pianist/organist and as the station's music librarian. Lyons's first broadcast was accidental; she was pressed into service one morning when the station's only female show host called in sick. She needed only a couple of minutes to become comfortable and familiar with how things were handled behind the microphone, and took over as host. The sponsor decided that it preferred the way Lyons handled the program; she was hired to replace the host who was ill. When she began her broadcasting career, Lyons said she believed her audience was intelligent and had more interests than the subjects covered by traditional women's programs, so she focused on topics other than cooking and household hints.

Lyons's prestige grew during the Great Flood of 1937, calming listeners and asking for donations for the victims. Lyons asked her listeners to help the flood victims with food, clothing and money. Lyons remained at the radio station, where she slept on her desk when she was not on the air with news reports or other emergency information. The Red Cross received $56,000 as a result of Lyons's radio appeals. At the time it was the largest amount raised for victims of a disaster. Largely because of her efforts during this time of crisis, Lyons was appointed WKRC's program director. While at WKRC, Lyons hosted a weekly radio show called Your Sunday Matinee; an amateur songwriter, she wrote a new song for each Sunday broadcast of the show. Bandleader Paul Whiteman was a guest on the show in 1938 and was impressed by Lyons's songwriting abilities. He offered to buy some of Lyons's original compositions with one stipulation: the music would need to be published under his name. Lyons politely declined.

=== WSAI and WLW ===
Lyons (center) at WSAI in 1943

In 1942, WKRC lost Lyons to Crosley Broadcasting over a ten dollar raise. When Lyons was approached by Crosley Broadcasting, the salary she was offered was ten dollars more than she was making at WKRC. Lyons then met with station owner Hulbert "Hub" Taft. Taft told her he could not match the sum offered by Crosley; Lyons then signed with Crosley, at first going to work at WSAI and taking 14 sponsors with her. Taft, the head of Taft Broadcasting, later said that the ten-dollar raise had cost his company millions in advertising. The Lyons radio and television programs generated more than a million dollars in ad revenue annually for Crosley. When Lyons's husband became ill with scarlet fever in 1943, the couple was confined to their home. Crosley considered having Lyons on the air to be important enough to install lines and equipment at their home, so Lyons could broadcast from there until the quarantine was over.

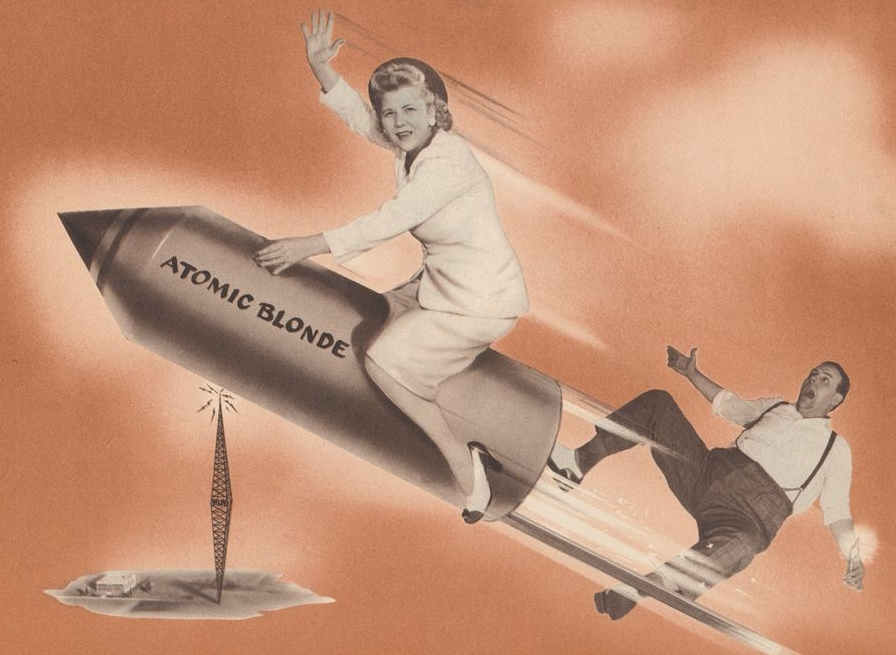
Frazier Thomas and Ruth Lyons at WLW Radio's "Morning Matinee", 1948. Taken from a station-issued promotional calendar.

Lyons, who was the host of Woman's Hour at WKRC, became the host of Petticoat Partyline, a program with a similar format, at WSAI. During her career at WKRC, Lyons had never followed a script for her programs. WSAI had a strict policy about writing and adhering to a script for their radio programs. She wrote scripts for her shows and read from them for a week before returning to her method of spontaneous conversation. Lyons anticipated being disciplined for this, but weeks and months went by without any complaints. When she was called to the manager's office and asked to bring the copy of her program script with her, Lyons expected to lose her job. When she entered the office, she admitted she had not been writing and reading from a program script for some time. The station manager said he was pleased with what she had been doing and that the purpose of the meeting was to offer her an opportunity to work at WLW. (Note: Throughout her entire broadcasting career, Lyons did not read from scripts-not even after moving to television. She was the only performer who was allowed to ignore the Crosley rules about adherence to program scripts and commercial copy.) Lyons also did not like reading commercial copy and preferred to deliver commercials in her own words. (Note: Most sponsors were content with the arrangement because Lyons had proven results of her ability to sell products.)

At WLW, she was the host of Consumer's Foundation, a show where participants tested products advertised on radio and reported their experiences with them. Lyons was teamed with Frazier Thomas, on another radio show called Collect Calls From Lowenthal. When Consumer's Foundation turned into Your Morning Matinee, a morning radio show with music and entertainment targeting female listeners, Thomas became Lyons's co-host on the program. After WLW parent company Crosley Broadcasting purchased New York City radio station WINS in 1946, the program was also heard over the station for two years. Lyons and Thomas co-hosted the show until he left to establish his own media production firm. Lyons continued as the host of the program until 1951, when she was advised by her doctor to cut back her work load.

== Television ==
=== The 50 Club ===
The 50 Club as seen on the NBC Television network

The 50/50 Club started on WLW Radio as The 50 Club. Fifty women were invited to a daily, one-hour lunch which was broadcast live. The program was Lyons's idea and it went on the air February 5, 1946. Even though Lyons was hesitant about working in television, the show made its television debut on WLWT in May 1949. She did not like the hot lights and the cameras which seemed to be everywhere. After seeing herself on camera, Lyons realized she needed to slim down to look attractive on television. Along with the weight loss, Lyons formulated her own set of rules for her television show. Since her programs were impromptu, those working with Lyons learned to expect almost anything and to make any necessary adjustments. The program was later simulcast on WLW AM. Lyons also became the program director of the television station in September 1949. She was the only woman on the Crosley Board of Directors.

The show was a powerful outlet for advertisers; potential sponsors had a one-year waiting period before there were openings for their commercials to be able to be scheduled. The mention of a product name on the program meant stores would quickly be sold out of the item. Lyons was also powerful enough to be able to decide which products were advertised on her programs. She selected those sponsors whose products she used and turned down commercials for products she did not like. (Note: Her ability to sell products extended to the clothing line she began in 1958.) She was also able to resolve differences between WLWT management and the local musicians' union before the disagreement turned into a walkout. Lyons stated that she considered herself one of the musicians and intended to walk the picket line with them if the dispute was not settled. Station management met the musicians' demands to ensure that Lyons would remain on the air. Lyons's willingness to both advise and to become involved in problems earned her the nickname "Mother" from her co-workers and fans. (Note: Lyons was aware of the nickname but said she did not know how it started.)

NBC was aware of Lyons's ability to sell her sponsors' products and hoped to have Lyons do the same for their network. In 1951, NBC contracted with Crosley to carry a half-hour of The 50 Club on the NBC television network for three years, beginning on October 1, 1951. Lyons bristled under the structured advertising, network time cues and loss of show control. She also did not want to relocate to New York; at the end of the first year, the contract was canceled and the program was no longer seen on national television. New York based media critic John Crosby was highly critical of the Lyons programs on NBC.

=== The 50-50 Club ===
The program was renamed The 50/50 Club when the audience was expanded to 100 people in 1953. It was seen on the other stations of the Crosley Broadcasting network in Dayton, Columbus, and Indianapolis and the program was expanded from its original hour to ninety minutes in length. The program visited the other cities it was seen in at least once a year so that local viewers could have the opportunity for tickets to see the show done live. Lyons's television show was popular enough to have a three-year waiting period for studio audience tickets.

Ohio Governor C. William O'Neill served as master of ceremonies for Ruth Lyons Day in 1957. He and Lyons are seen at left. Lyons's daughter, Candy, program co-host, Bob Braun and husband, Herman Newman, are seen at right. Lyons is holding her trademark bouquet of flowers which concealed her microphone.

In 1957, Cincinnati's mayor, Charles Taft, proclaimed a "Ruth Lyons Day". The event, held at the city's Taft Theatre, was a much larger venue than WLWT provided for its daily 50-50 Club, but it was unable to provide seating for the 100,000 ticket requests it received. The show was the top rated daytime television program in the US from 1952 to 1964 and the first program in the Cincinnati market to be broadcast in color in 1957. During this time, Lyons and the program were profiled in many national magazines such as McCall's, Ladies' Home Journal and Cosmopolitan. (Note: Crosley highly valued Lyons. In the mid 1950s her annual salary topped $100,000. When she began full-time at WKRC, Lyons's salary was $25 weekly.)

NBC made another attempt to bring Lyons to the network. She was invited to be a temporary replacement for The Today Show cast member Helen O'Connell for a week in April 1958. Both Cincinnati media and viewers remembered the stinging criticism from the Crosby column and were prepared to see any slight, intentional or not, as an insult to Lyons and their area. The Cincinnati Enquirer printed that Lyons made only two short appearances on one Today broadcast and read a commercial while hidden by foliage on the set on a later show. Lyons received much mail from her fans saying she was badly treated while in New York. Lyons's answer was to explain that the Today program's format was different from that of The 50/50 Club and that she never expected to be talking with people on the Today show as she did on her own television program. (Note: To work on the network, Lyons would have to give up the almost total control she had over her WLWT program and to accept the rigid network constraints of adhering to scripts and commercial copy. She was apparently unwilling to do this.)

Guests included Bob Hope, Arthur Godfrey and pianist Peter Nero. During the 1950s, when nightclub venues were numerous throughout the nation, two of the most prominent in the country were the Beverly Hills Supper Club and the Lookout House, in the Northern Kentucky area of Greater Cincinnati. Virtually every headliner, including Jack E. Leonard, Nelson Eddy, Ted Lewis, Pearl Bailey, Myron Cohen, and many others, appeared on Ruth Lyons's program. Musical guests had to perform live as Lyons permitted no pre-recorded music and lip sync on her program.

Lyons had two trademarks: concealing her microphone in a bouquet of flowers and the white gloves she and her studio audience wore while singing "The Waving Song", as they waved to the viewers at home. Her practice was not to meet her program's guests before airtime so the conversations would be spontaneous. Lyons frequently mentioned her husband and daughter on the show, in a warm, light (often humorous), family context.

== Marriages and later life ==
=== Johnny Lyons ===
During Lyons's school years, her family moved five times. A move just after Lyons's high school graduation brought them to Cincinnati's Tusculum Avenue where the Lyons family also lived. Johnny Lyons was charming and handsome enough to be described as "the heart-throb of Tusculum Avenue". They became a couple not long after the Reeves family had moved into the neighborhood. After an eight-year courtship, they were married on August 6, 1932.

After the couple had been married two years, the insurance agency Johnny worked for decided to close its Cincinnati office. He was offered a promotion to insurance underwriter and an opportunity to relocate to the company's Cleveland office. He expected that his wife would leave WKRC to join him in Cleveland. Lyons did not want to leave her radio work and believed she had obligations to her parents that would keep her in Cincinnati. She moved back into her parents' home while Johnny moved to his new job in Cleveland.

The couple kept their marriage going for some years with weekend visits, but they eventually grew apart. Lyons became a very popular radio personality in Cincinnati while Johnny was later transferred to New York and Chicago. Lyons filed for divorce in April 1939; she did not do so until after the death of her mother in 1938 because she said her mother did not "consider divorced women respectable". Her husband was now working in Milwaukee and did not contest the divorce. (Note: Lyons never spoke about the marriage in public and omitted all mention of it from her book Remember With Me. In 1963, McCall's magazine named her an outstanding American woman in broadcasting, giving her the Golden Mike Award. The ceremony was held in Tulsa, Oklahoma; Lyons's ex-husband was now living in the city. Lyons appointed someone to appear in her stead at the awards banquet and someone from McCall's traveled to Cincinnati to present the award.)

=== Herman Newman ===
After the divorce, Lyons gave up hope for another marriage because she despaired of finding "a man who wouldn't hate my success". In 1942 she met a Unitarian minister named Herman Newman at a benefit concert she attended. Newman later became a professor of English at University of Cincinnati, and maintained an identity separate from the program and his wife's celebrity. Shortly after their meeting, Crosley approached Lyons with the offer for a ten dollar salary increase; Newman advised her to accept the offer. The couple was married on October 3, 1942. (Note: Herman Newman died in 1991.)

In 1944, Lyons gave birth to a stillborn daughter. The couple's grief was so great, Lyons's doctor suggested adopting a baby girl who was born at the hospital two days earlier; the adoption remained a private matter for many years. Candace Laird Newman made her first visit to WLW when she was six weeks old; she continued to appear on radio and television periodically while growing up.

=== Later years, retirement and death ===
The mid-1960s were a time of illness and sorrow for Lyons and her family. She had maintained close ties with her younger sister, Rose; her sister died in 1964 after a ten-year battle with cancer. Lyons suffered a minor stroke in December 1964 and had to take a leave of absence from her television program. In January 1965, there was another family medical crisis; 20-year-old Candy had discovered a lump in her breast which turned out to be malignant. She underwent surgery and radiation; by September, she was well enough to join the cast of The 50-50 Club on a permanent basis. In early 1966, it became apparent that Candy's illness was now terminal; she wanted to return to Europe one last time. The Newman family left New York in early June. When they arrived in Italy, Candy was quite ill and was hospitalized; they began preparations for their return to the US on June 14. On June 19, 1966, Candy died aboard the ship before it reached New York. (Note: Services were held for Candy Newman in New York, where her remains were also cremated. Soon after her death, a rumor began to circulate that she had committed suicide by jumping from the ship.)

Lyons took an extended leave from her television program beginning in February 1966 due to her daughter's illness and subsequent death; she did not return to her show until October. Initially, Lyons was unsure if she wanted to go back on the air. She wanted to raise money for the Christmas fund in her daughter's memory and decided to take things a day at a time. Those close to Lyons say Candy's death took the life out of her as well. There were times when Lyons was unable to do her program; when she did, it was sometimes difficult to understand what she was saying.

On January 26, 1967, The 50-50 Club had just gone off the air when Lyons told her co-host, Bob Braun, that she had now done her last television program. Braun had begun a later afternoon show of his own, The Bob Braun Show, a few days before and was working with Lyons until a replacement was found. A public announcement was made on the program the next day with a statement from Lyons to her viewers saying she was no longer able to continue hosting the show. Braun then became the host of the program. Lyons never appeared on television again.

In 1969, Lyons published her memoirs entitled Remember With Me. Though she had been off the air for more than two years prior to its publication, the book sold 90,000 copies. Over time, Lyons's health steadily declined. She began suffering a series of strokes in the 1970s and again in the 1980s. For the last three and a half years prior to her death, Lyons was bedridden. She died on November 7, 1988.

== Legacy and honors ==
The Ruth Lyons Christmas Fund began in 1939 and still provides Cincinnati-area hospitalized children with toys, Christmas decorations and even needed hospital equipment. After a visit to the children's ward of a local hospital, Lyons realized the young patients had nothing to make their stay more pleasant. She spoke about this on her radio program and began fund raising to provide hospitalized children with toys and some Christmas cheer at the holiday time.

Lyons began raising money for the fund on her programs each year on her birthday (October 4). She also wrote Christmas songs – such as "The Christmas Marching Song" and "This is Christmas" – which were performed on the programs and recorded to benefit the fund. After Lyons's retirement in 1967, her co-host, Bob Braun, became the host of The 50-50 Club and took over the fund raising duties. To raise awareness that the charity was not seasonal, the name was changed to the Ruth Lyons Children's Fund in 1996. Since its beginning, the fund has raised tens of millions of dollars.

David Letterman, who watched The 50/50 Club with his mother while home from school at lunch break, credits Lyons with teaching him everything about live talk television. Phil Donahue paid tribute to Lyons saying, "If there had not been a Crosley Broadcasting with its commitment to local programming, and if there had not been a Ruth Lyons, I probably wouldn't be here."

The City of Cincinnati honored Lyons's years of service to the community by naming a downtown street "Ruth Lyons Lane" in her honor in 1983. Lyons's life and work was the subject of a 2009 book, Before Oprah: Ruth Lyons, the Woman Who Invented Talk TV and a 2012 documentary, Ruth Lyons: First Lady of Television. The documentary won several local Emmy Awards. In 2011, an Ohio Historical Marker was placed near the site of the home on Tusculum Avenue where Lyons lived with her parents.

== Sources cited ==
- Banks, Michael A., ed. (2009). Before Oprah: Ruth Lyons, the Woman Who Invented Talk TV. Orange Frazer Press. ISBN 978-1-933-19749-4.
- Cassidy, Marsha F. (2005). What Women Watched Daytime Television in the 1950s. University of Texas Press. ISBN 978-0-292-70626-2.
- Cassidy, Marcia F.; White, Mimi (2002). "Innovating Women's Television in Local and National Networks:Ruth Lyons and Arlene Francis". Camera Obscura. 17 (3). Duke University press: 31–69. doi:10.1215/02705346-17-3_51-31. ISSN 0270-5346. S2CID 144702830.
- Keller, Cynthia (Winter 1995). "Mother: Cincinnati's Million-Dollar Housewife". Queen City Heritage. 53 (4). Cincinnati Historical Society. ISSN 0194-2883.
- Perry, Dick (1971). Not Just A Sound:The Story Of WLW (PDF). Prentice-Hall. ISBN 0-13-623876-9.
- Stern, David; McClure, Rusty; Banks, Michael A. (2008). Crosley: Two Brothers and a Business Empire That Transformed the Nation. Ternary Publishing LLC. ISBN 978-1-5786-0322-0.
- Wilson, Scott (2016). Resting Places: The Burial Sites of More Than 14,000 Famous Persons, 3d ed. (2 volume set). McFarland. ISBN 978-1-4766-2599-7.
