= Where No One Stands Alone (album) =

Compilation album by Elvis Presley
- Released: August 10, 2018
- Genre: Gospel, contemporary Christian
- Label: RCA; Legacy
- Producer: Joel Weinshanker; Lisa Marie Presley; Andy Childs

Elvis Presley chronology
Elvis Presley: The Searcher (2018)	Where No One Stands Alone (2018)

Singles from Where No One Stands Alone
- 1. "Saved" Released: July 25, 2018; 2. "Where No One Stands Alone" Released: August 3, 2018

Where No One Stands Alone is a compilation album by American singer Elvis Presley (1935–1977). It was released worldwide on August 10, 2018, by RCA Records and Legacy Recordings, entering at number one on Billboard's Christian Album chart and remaining there for two weeks and in the top ten for an additional two weeks. The album features archival vocal recordings of Elvis mostly from the gospel albums How Great Thou Art (1967) and He Touched Me (1972) accompanied by newly recorded instrumentation and backing vocals. The album's title track, "Where No One Stands Alone", is a newly recorded duet with Lisa Marie Presley.

== Track listing ==
No.	Title	Length
1.	"I've Got Confidence"	3:34
2.	"Where No One Stands Alone" (with Lisa Marie Presley)	3:40
3.	"Saved"	3:31
4.	"Crying in the Chapel"	2:34
5.	"So High"	2:43
6.	"Stand by Me"	2:48
7.	"Bosom of Abraham"	2:24
8.	"How Great Thou Art"	3:09
9.	"I, John"	3:06
10.	"You'll Never Walk Alone"	3:05
11.	"He Touched Me"	3:05
12.	"In the Garden"	3:54
13.	"He Is My Everything"	3:05
14.	"Amazing Grace"	3:29

== Personnel ==
Credits adapted from AllMusic.

- Elvis Presley - lead vocals, original arrangements

Returning former backing vocalists

- Bill Baize – backing vocals
- Terry Blackwood – backing vocals
- Ed Hill – backing vocals
- Armond Morales – backing vocals
- Jim Murray – backing vocals
- Cissy Houston – backing vocals
- Darlene Love – backing vocals
- Larry Strickland – backing vocals
- Donnie Sumner – backing vocals

Additional musicians

- Roy Agee – trombone
- Mike Brignardello – bass
- Pat Buchanan – electric guitar
- Christ Church Choir – backing vocals
- Shawnel Corley – backing vocals
- Scott Ducaj – trumpet
- Terry Franklin – backing vocals
- Gus Gaches – vocal arrangement, backing vocals
- Tom Hemby – electric guitar
- Jim Horn – horn arrangements, saxophone
- B. James Lowry – acoustic guitar
- Greg Marrow – drums, percussion
- Steve Mauldin – choir arrangement
- Gale Mayes – backing vocals
- Garren McCloud – backing vocals
- Phil Nitz – backing vocals
- Daniel Palma – backing vocals
- Denise Palma – backing vocals
- Christopher Phillips – choir director
- Angela Primm – backing vocals
- Jimmie Lee Sloas – bass
- Robb Tripp – backing vocals
- Jason Perks – keyboards
- Lonnie Wilson – drums, percussion

Production staff

- Andy Childs – keyboards, producer, backing vocals
- Lisa Marie Presley – producer; lead vocals on "Where No One Stands Alone"
- Joel Weinshanker – producer
- Kevin Boettger – assistant mastering engineer
- Tom Burleigh – product development director
- Jake Burns – assistant engineer
- Tony Castle – engineer, vocal engineer
- Taylor Chadwick – assistant mastering engineer
- Andrew Darby – assistant mastering engineer
- Josh Ditty – assistant engineer
- Shannon Finnegan – production coordination
- Bobbi Giel – assistant mastering engineer
- John Guess – engineer
- Roy Hendrickson – engineer
- Garth Justice – engineer
- Jennifer Kirell – project director
- Matt Leigh – assistant engineer
- Steve Mandile – engineer, electric guitar
- Andrew Mendelson – Mastering
- Jim Parham – project director
- Ed Seay – engineer, mixer, vocal engineer
- Chaz Sexton – assistant engineer
- Neal Shaw – assistant engineer
- Shao Jean Sim – assistant engineer
- Ryan Yount – assistant engineer

== Charts ==
Chart (2018)	Peak position
Australian Albums (ARIA)	15
Austrian Albums (Ö3 Austria)	37
Belgian Albums (Ultratop Flanders)	26
Belgian Albums (Ultratop Wallonia)	54
Dutch Albums (Album Top 100)	15
German Albums (Offizielle Top 100)	37
Irish Albums (IRMA)	27
Scottish Albums (OCC)	6
Spanish Albums (PROMUSICAE)	60
Swiss Albums (Schweizer Hitparade)	24
UK Albums (OCC)	9
US Billboard 200	22
US Christian Albums (Billboard)	1
