= Milky White Way =

Song by The Coleman Brothers
- Songwriter: Lander Coleman

"Milky White Way"

Song by Elvis Presley

from the album His Hand In Mine
- B-side: "Swing Down Sweet Chariot"
- Released: February 15, 1966
- Recorded: October 30, 1960
- Studio: RCA Studio B, Nashville
- Genre: Gospel
- Label: RCA Victor

Elvis Presley singles chronology
"Joshua Fit The Battle (Elvis Presley song)"	"Milky White Way"	"Frankie and Johnny"

"Milky White Way" is a gospel standard written by Lander Coleman, who was a quartet singer for the Coleman Brothers. The song became a million-selling hit record in 1947 when the CBS Trumpeteers, a black quartet from Baltimore, recorded it. In the late 1940s the CBS Trumpeteers had a popular morning radio show over the CBS network called 7:15 A.M.! and "Milky White Way" was their theme song. Elvis Presley also recorded a version on October 30–31, 1960, at RCA's Studio B in Nashville, Tennessee.

A version of the song was released in 2018 on the Paul Poulton album "Heaven".
