= WLWT =

Television station in Cincinnati

- Cincinnati, Ohio; United States
- Channels: Digital: 20 (UHF); Virtual: 5
- Branding: WLWT 5; WLWT News 5

Programming
- Affiliations: 5.1: NBC; for others, see § Subchannels

Ownership
- Owner: Hearst Television; (Ohio-Oklahoma Hearst Television Inc.)

History
- First air date: February 9, 1948
- Former call signs: W8XCT (experimental, 1946–1948)
- Former channel numbers: Analog: 1 (VHF, 1946–1948), 4 (VHF, 1948–1952), 5 (VHF, 1952–2009); Digital: 35 (UHF, 1998–2019)
- Former affiliations: All secondary: CBS/ABC/DuMont (1948–1949); UPN (January–September 1998)
- Call sign meaning: "WLW Television" (former sister to radio station)

Technical information
- Licensing authority: FCC
- Facility ID: 46979
- ERP: 880 kW
- HAAT: 309.2 m (1,014 ft)
- Transmitter coordinates: 39°7′27″N 84°31′18″W

Links
- Public license information: Public file; LMS
- Website: www.wlwt.com

WLWT (channel 5) is a television station in Cincinnati, Ohio, United States, affiliated with NBC and owned by Hearst Television. The station's studios are located on Young Street, and its transmitter is located on Chickasaw Street, both in the Mount Auburn neighborhood of Cincinnati.

== History ==
=== The Crosley/Avco years ===
WLWT was established by the Crosley Broadcasting Corporation, owners of WLW (700 AM), one of the United States' most powerful radio stations. Crosley Broadcasting was a subsidiary of the Crosley Corporation, which became a subsidiary of the Aviation Corporation (later known as Avco) in 1945. After starting experimental broadcasts in 1946 as W8XCT on channel 1, the station began commercial broadcasts on February 9, 1948, on VHF channel 4, making it Cincinnati's first television station and Ohio's second (after WEWS, Cleveland). The station's studios were housed with WLW in the Crosley Square building, a converted Elks lodge in downtown Cincinnati.

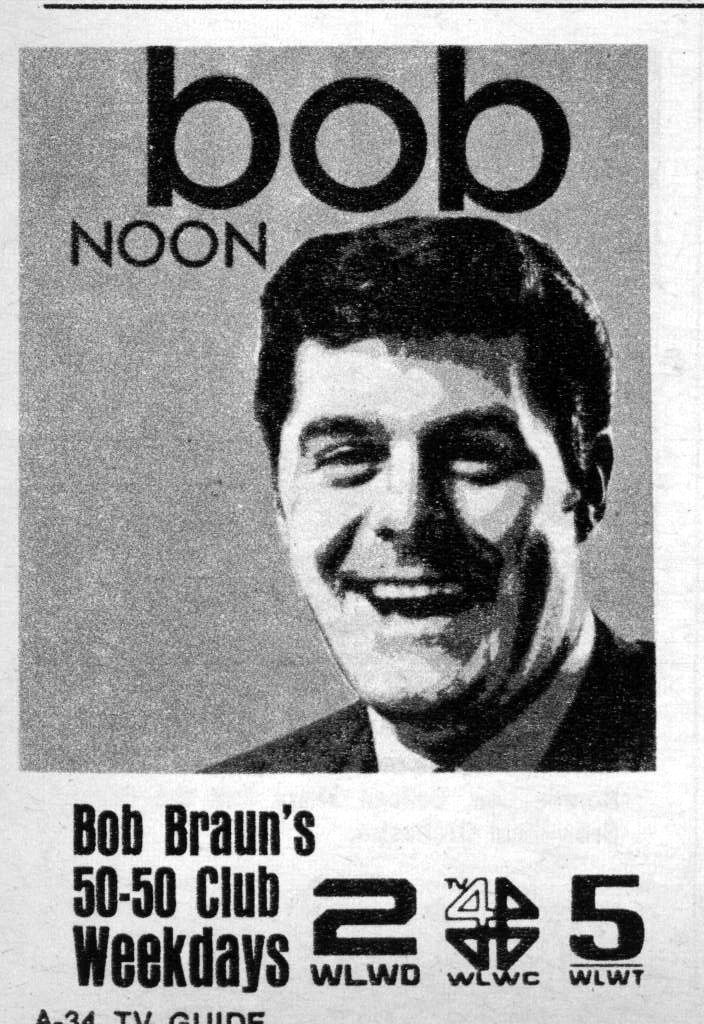
1969 Advertisement for The Bob Braun Show appearing in TV Guide.

WLWT counts itself as the first television station outside the Eastern U.S. (other than network-owned stations) to become a primary NBC television affiliate, but originally carried programming from all the major television networks of the time: NBC, ABC, CBS and DuMont. WLWT later affiliated exclusively with NBC in 1949, after WKRC-TV (originally on channel 11, now on channel 12) and WCPO-TV (originally on channel 7, now on channel 9) signed on during that year. Following the release of the FCC's Sixth Report and Order in 1952, all of Cincinnati's VHF stations changed channels. WLWT was reassigned to channel 5, as the previous channel 4 allocation was shifted north to Columbus and given to sister station WLWC (now WCMH-TV), which began operations in April 1949.

In addition to WLWT and WLWC, Crosley also operated stations in nearby markets, WLWD (channel 2, now WDTN) in Dayton, which signed-on in March 1949; and WLWI (channel 13, now WTHR) in Indianapolis, which opened in October 1957. These four inter-connected stations were branded on-air as the "WLW Network", and their call letters were stylized with hyphens to further reflect their connections to each other—the Cincinnati station, the group's flagship, was known as "WLW-T". Crosley also owned WLWA (now WXIA-TV) in Atlanta (purchased in 1953 and sold in 1962) and WOAI-TV in San Antonio (acquired in 1965, sold in 1974).

The three WLW television stations in Ohio were NBC affiliates, and carried common programming along with WLWI in Indianapolis (an ABC affiliate). Most of these shows were produced at the WLWT studios on Crosley Square, and included The Ruth Lyons 50-50 Club (later hosted by Bob Braun after Lyons' retirement in 1967), the Paul Dixon Show and Midwestern Hayride; some of these programs were syndicated regionally to other stations outside of the Crosley group.

In 1957, WLWT became the first station in the Cincinnati market to begin color television broadcasts. It later became the first station in the nation to broadcast entirely in color, giving Cincinnati the nickname "Colortown U.S.A." by 1962. For a period during the 1970s, the station's slogan was "5, The Originator", in reference to all of the local programming that was produced by the station.

The Crosley broadcast division took the name of its parent company in 1968, becoming Avco Broadcasting Corporation. In 1969, the FCC enacted its "one-to-a-market" rule, which enforced a ban on common ownership of AM radio stations and television stations with overlapping coverage areas under certain conditions while grandfathering some already existing instances. Avco's ownership of WLW radio (a 50,000-watt, clear-channel station) and WLWT, and the Columbus, Dayton and Indianapolis television stations was initially protected under the new rule. While WLWT's channel 5 potential coverage area covered a large amount of the Dayton and Columbus markets, the station was forced by the FCC to transmit with a shorter broadcast tower, thus reducing the signal overlap between WLWT, WLWC, and WLWD.

=== Later years ===
In the mid-1970s, Avco decided to exit broadcasting and sold all of its stations to separate buyers. WLWT was the next to last to be sold, going to Multimedia, Inc. in March 1976. As a result, the stations all lost their grandfathered protection, which led to an ownership conflict situation which Hearst-Argyle (predecessor to today's Hearst Television) would encounter two decades later (the FCC has since relaxed its adjacent-market ownership rules). All of the "WLW Network" TV stations except for flagship WLWT would change their call signs, leaving WLWT as the only one with any physical evidence that it was connected to WLW radio, a station that ironically would be a sister station to WLWT's rival WKRC-TV years later. Multimedia would later acquire Avco Program Sales and with it, the regional syndication rights to Braun's program, along with The Phil Donahue Show; the resulting subsidiary, Multimedia Entertainment, was initially based at WLWT.

In July 1995, the Gannett Company announced that it would acquire Multimedia. Once the deal was approved in November of that year, the FCC ruled that Gannett would have to divest WLWT, WMAZ-TV in Macon, Georgia, and KOCO-TV in Oklahoma City, Oklahoma, due to ownership restrictions; Gannett ultimately retained ownership of WMAZ-TV after the FCC allowed companies to own more television stations. As Gannett had owned The Cincinnati Enquirer since 1979 (and remains the newspaper's owner to this day) and had recently acquired Oklahoma City–based cable provider Multimedia Cablevision, the company had to obtain a temporary waiver of an FCC cross-ownership rule which prohibited common ownership of a television station and a newspaper or a cable television provider in the same market in order for Gannett to close on the Multimedia group. When the waiver expired in December 1996, Gannett opted to keep the Enquirer (as well as sister newspaper The Niagara Gazette, which would later be sold) and swap WLWT and KOCO-TV to Argyle Television Holdings II in exchange for WGRZ in Buffalo, New York, and WZZM in Grand Rapids, Michigan, a deal which was finalized in January 1997.

Argyle merged with the broadcasting unit of the Hearst Corporation to form Hearst-Argyle Television in August 1997. Hearst had owned WDTN (the former WLWD) since 1981, but was not allowed to keep both stations due to a since-repealed FCC rule prohibiting common ownership of stations with overlapping city-grade signals. In 1998, Hearst traded WDTN and WNAC-TV in Providence, Rhode Island, to Sunrise Television in exchange for KSBW in Salinas, California, WPTZ in Plattsburgh, New York, and WNNE in Hartford, Vermont. WLWT's licensee name under Multimedia and Gannett ownership, "Multimedia Entertainment, Inc.", survives to this day as the licensee name for WGRZ. In June 1996, WKRC-TV and WCPO-TV traded networks, leaving WLWT as the only Cincinnati television station to never change its affiliation. Additionally, the purchase by Hearst made WLWT sister stations with Hearst flagship stations WTAE-TV in Pittsburgh and WBAL-TV in Baltimore, leading to all three stations to have a friendly rivalry with each other during the NFL season, as all three local NFL teams (Cincinnati Bengals, Pittsburgh Steelers, Baltimore Ravens) are division rivals in the AFC North.

WLWT briefly aired UPN programming as a secondary affiliation during the early morning hours on weekends at certain points in 1998 (the network was then limited to a six-hour weekly schedule), after that netlet was displaced from its previous affiliate WSTR-TV (channel 64) by The WB. The expected lower ratings in a late night time slot on WLWT (along with low promotion of UPN programming outside of Star Trek: Voyager) saw UPN capitulate and affiliate with former WB affiliate WBQC-CA (channel 25) in September 1998 as the network expanded to a ten-hour schedule that month which would have likely seen program rejections from WLWT due to lack of schedule room.

In June 1999, WLWT moved its studios from Crosley Square to the Mount Auburn neighborhood, in a building that once served as the corporate headquarters of WKRC-TV's founding owners Taft Broadcasting. This is because after abandoning local non-news program production, the station found that Crosley Square, with its two-story ballrooms and basement newsroom, was built more for live entertainment broadcasts than a news operation.

Logo used by the station from 2004 to 2013.

In June 2007, WLWT announced that it would partner with WLW (AM) to provide news and weather for the radio station. As a consequence, WLWT's news and weather updates were heard nationwide on WLW's XM Satellite Radio channel, at channel 173; the agreement with XM ended in the summer of 2008. WLWT and WLW shared news and weather operations for years while both were owned by Crosley Broadcasting, but eventual separate ownerships of the two stations (WLWT to Argyle, then Hearst Television; WLW to Clear Channel) led to WLW radio using the resources of WKRC-TV for several years until the renewed partnership with its former television sister. The modern WLW-WLWT partnership ended on March 31, 2010; WLWT currently provides news and weather to several Cincinnati radio stations.

The transmission tower seen at the beginning of the 1978–1982 CBS sitcom WKRP in Cincinnati actually belonged to WLWT—it was located at the WLWT transmitter at 2222 Chickasaw Street. That red and white tower stood side by side with WLWT's current strobed tower until 2005, when it was dismantled.

On July 9, 2012, WLWT's parent company Hearst Television was involved in a dispute with Time Warner Cable, leading to WLWT being pulled from Time Warner Cable and temporarily replaced with Nexstar Broadcasting Group station WTWO in Terre Haute, Indiana; Time Warner opted for such a distant signal like WTWO, as it does not have the rights to carry any NBC affiliate closest to them. The substitution of WTWO in place of WLWT lasted until July 19, 2012, when a carriage deal was reached between Hearst and Time Warner.

In 2014, the station aired a Thursday Night Football game from NFL Network (produced by CBS Sports) in lieu of CBS affiliate WKRC-TV, who exercised their option of the right of first refusal. The station today airs up to four Bengals games a year, usually as part of NBC Sunday Night Football or ESPN's Monday Night Football (WLWT parent Hearst holds a 20 percent interest in the ESPN joint venture with Disney). The latter (if not a national simulcast on ABC through WCPO-TV) means a delay of The Voice to overnight hours, with voting limited to the internet during the program's normal timeslot.

== Programming ==
WLWT clears most of the NBC programming schedule. However, the station airs the network's Saturday lineup out of pattern. WLWT delays NBC's educational block, The More You Know, by one hour due to a 10 a.m. newscast. The station also airs the Saturday edition of NBC Nightly News on a half-hour tape delay at 7 p.m. due to an hour-long 6 p.m. newscast.

=== Sports coverage ===
==== Cincinnati Reds ====
The Cincinnati Reds baseball team, also owned by Crosley until 1961, broadcast its games over WLWT from 1947 through 1995. The station also fed the games to a network of stations that covered Ohio, Kentucky, Indiana, West Virginia, and Tennessee (and included some of its Crosley-owned sister stations). It continued originating Reds games long after most "Big Three" stations dropped local sports programming. The station also aired any nationally televised Reds games through NBC's MLB broadcast contract from its 1948 sign-on until 1989, including their back-to-back World Series titles in 1975 and 1976.

Waite Hoyt was the original play-by-play announcer on WLWT, in a simulcast with WLW Radio. George Bryson Sr. replaced him in 1956. When Ed Kennedy became the play-by-play announcer in 1961, he would remain for 11 seasons, working with Frank McCormick for eight seasons. Also calling games on WLWT were Ken Wilson, Charlie Jones, Bill Brown, Ray Lane, Johnny Bench, and Joe Morgan.

Citing financial losses along with declining ratings and a new contract with NBC that limits preemptions of network programming, WLWT did not renew its contract with the Reds following the 1995 season.

WLWT returned to broadcasting Reds games in 2024, albeit only the Opening Day game, in a simulcast with Bally Sports Ohio (now FanDuel Sports Network Ohio). Reds coverage would move to WXIX-TV the following season.

In March 2026, WLWT became the new official weather provider for the Reds.

==== Cincinnati Bengals ====
In 1968, when the Cincinnati Bengals were enfranchised by the American Football League, channel 5 became the station of record for the team as Avco acquired broadcast rights to the team's preseason games, which were also distributed to Dayton, Columbus, and Indianapolis. WLWT would also carry most regular-season Bengals games through NBC's contracts with the AFL and the National Football League through the end of the 1997 season, when NBC lost its broadcast rights to the American Football Conference to CBS. In the present-day WLWT airs Bengals games when they are featured on NBC's Sunday Night Football as well as ESPN's Monday Night Football, a benefit of WLWT owner Hearst's 20 percent stake in the sports network. The station has aired the Bengals' appearances in Super Bowls XXIII and LVI.

=== News operation ===
WLWT presently broadcasts 42 hours of locally produced newscasts each week (with 6 1/2 hours each weekday, 4 1/2 hours on Saturdays and five hours on Sundays). As of February 2012, WLWT generally had the third-rated local newscasts in the Cincinnati market; however, it has been showing steady ratings growth in its newscasts in recent years. WLWT now places first or second in all newscasts in the key adult demographics. It was the number one rated newscast in the city for several years when Jerry Springer served as anchorperson.

On April 20, 2013, WLWT became the fourth and final Cincinnati television station to begin broadcasting its local newscasts in high definition. Prior to the upgrade, its newscasts aired in 16:9 widescreen standard definition. With the switch to HD, WLWT debuted a new set.

In the mid-2000s through the early 2010s, the station maintained a weather beacon atop the Radisson Hotel in Covington, Kentucky, dubbed the "Weather Lights".

== Technical information ==
=== Subchannels ===
The station's signal is multiplexed:

Subchannels of WLWT
Subchannel	Res.	Short name	Programming
5.1	1080i	WLWT-HD	NBC
5.2	480i	WLWT-ME	MeTV
5.4	480i	STORY	Story Television
5.5	480i	GET TV	Great
64.1	720p	WSTR	MyNetworkTV (WSTR-TV)

Broadcast on behalf of another station

NBC Weather Plus ceased network operations in late 2008; however, WLWT continued to broadcast local weather programming as "News 5 Weather Plus" on its digital subchannel until June 30, 2011. The subchannel switched to MeTV on July 1, 2011.

=== Analog-to-digital conversion ===
WLWT ended regular programming on its analog signal, over VHF channel 5, on June 12, 2009, as part of the federally mandated transition from analog to digital television. The station's digital signal remained on its pre-transition UHF channel 35, using virtual channel 5.

As part of the SAFER Act, WLWT kept its analog signal on the air until July 12 to inform viewers of the digital television transition through a loop of public service announcements from the National Association of Broadcasters.
