= Bob Braun =

American broadcaster

- Born: Robert E. Braun; April 20, 1929; Ludlow, Kentucky, U.S.A.
- Died: January 15, 2001 (aged 71); Cincinnati, Ohio, U.S.A.
- Occupations: Television and radio host
- Known for: The Bob Braun Show
- Spouse: Wray Jean
- Children: Rob, Doug, and Melissa

Robert E. Braun (April 20, 1929 – January 15, 2001) was an American local television and radio personality, best known for a program originating in Cincinnati, Ohio, named The Bob Braun Show. The show, which he hosted from 1967 to 1984, had the highest Arbitron and Nielsen ratings of any live entertainment/information program in the Midwestern United States. Originating at WLWT, the 90-minute live telecasts originally were syndicated to three other cities in the Midwest. Eventually, more television stations joined the line-up. Braun's show featured a live band, singers, and special guests including Bob Hope (a frequent guest), Lucille Ball, Johnny Carson, Paul Lynde, Red Skelton, Phyllis Diller, Dick Clark and NFL-star Jim Brown. Politicians including Gerald Ford, Ronald Reagan, Jimmy Carter, George H. W. Bush, John Glenn, and Ted Kennedy were also guests.

== Early life ==
Bob Braun began his career at the age of thirteen with WSAI Radio, hosting a Saturday morning Knothole Baseball sports show. He joined WCPO-TV in 1949. In 1957, after winning the $1,000 top prize on television's Arthur Godfrey's Talent Scouts talent show, Braun was immediately hired by WLWT and WLW-AM. After cutting a handful of unsuccessful pop vocal recordings for labels such as Fraternity and Torch, Braun signed to Decca Records and charted his only Top 40 hit, "Till Death Do Us Part", in 1962. The album with the same name, released later that year peaked at No. 99 on the album charts. Braun later recorded for United Artists, but most of his subsequent recording efforts were released on small independent or vanity labels. He also hosted a weekly show on WLW-T called "Bob Braun's Bandstand". Similar to Dick Clark's American Bandstand when it began, i.e., a local show that showcased local teens dancing to the top 40 hits of the day and sometimes having guest singers or groups that were passing through Cincinnati. Locals from the tri-state area wrote in to the host station to secure tickets. This coincided with the time he was appearing on Ruth Lyons' 50-50 Club weekdays noon to 1:30.

== Career ==
=== The Bob Braun Show ===
The local Cincinnati television show titled The 50-50 Club had occupied the time slot that Braun eventually filled. The 50-50 Club hostess, Ruth Lyons, retired in 1967 due to declining health. Braun had appeared regularly on The 50-50 Club show since 1957, and frequently had been a fill-in host. On his own show, Braun heavily promoted and supported Lyons' charity, "The Ruth Lyons Christmas Fund," each Christmas season. (The charity, now known as "The Ruth Lyons Children's Fund", remains in operation to this day.) Some years after Braun took over the show, the title was changed from The 50-50 Club to The Bob Braun Show. (An ad in a 1969 issue of TV Guide magazine identifies it as Bob Braun's 50-50 Club.) Toward the end of its run in the 1980s, it was renamed Braun and Company.

Regular cast members on The Bob Braun Show included Rob Reider, Mary Ellen Tanner, Nancy James, baritone Mark Preston (member of The Lettermen), and announcer/weatherman Bill Myers. Beginning with the telecast on the daytime schedule of Friday, June 7, 1968, an entertainment critic for a Columbus, Ohio newspaper, Ron Pataky, visited Cincinnati every Friday to discuss on Braun's television show which movies were playing in local cinemas that weekend. Pataky continued making his Friday appearances until 1973.

The longtime director of The 50-50 Club, Bob Braun's 50-50 Club and The Bob Braun Show was Dick Murgatroyd, who years later became the county-judge executive of Kenton County, Kentucky.

The Department of Photographs and Films at the Cincinnati Museum Center has videotapes of The Bob Braun Show and Braun and Company that were preserved starting in 1982. All episodes of Braun's daytime show that were telecast prior to 1982 were lost because of unfortunate wiping and deletion / erasure of videotapes and videocassettes. Many short segments were preserved, however, most of them musical performances, and can be seen on YouTube. Researchers can not find an entire 90-minute daytime broadcast show that is linked to a particular date from the period of 1967 to 1982. Only the snippets survive. None of Ron Pataky's commentaries on movies survive. The show's staff classified them as topical without lasting value.

Evidently, in 1969, Braun did a prime-time special on which Nick Clooney and his eight-year-old son George were guests. George talked on-camera about his recent tonsillectomy. That television broadcast was preserved and is available for viewing at the Department of Photographs and Films at the Cincinnati Museum Center.

=== Other work ===
In the mid-1970s he briefly hosted a local game show called On The Money. Braun recorded his album "Women of My Dreams" in 1982 on the ANRO label. It featured original tunes written by the famous George David Weiss and also Roger Bowling who wrote Coward of the County for Kenny Rogers and was arranged by Angelo DiPippo with liner notes written by Bob's good friend Dick Clark. Bob Braun was one of Cincinnati's biggest TV stars until 1984, when he moved to California for ten years to do commercials, talk shows and small movie roles. During that time, he was most often seen as the spokesperson for Craftmatic adjustable beds and announcer for controversial no-money-down real estate promoter Tony Hoffman, who later produced and marketed a recorded interview with O. J. Simpson. Braun also had a part in the Bruce Willis movie Die Hard 2.

== Accolades ==
In 1993, he was inducted into the Cincinnati Radio Hall of Fame. In March 1994, Braun left Hollywood and returned to WSAI Radio (by then featuring an adult standards musical format) as one of "The Sunrise Boys", working as the morning host alongside his nephew, "Bucks" Braun (himself a successful radio personality in nearby Dayton, Ohio) and newsman Don Herman. In June 1997, Mayor Roxanne Qualls and the entire City Council honored him with "Bob Braun Day in Cincinnati".

== Later years and death ==
Braun retired on November 24, 1999, after being diagnosed with Parkinson's disease. His show business career had spanned a half century. He was replaced on WSAI by Nick Clooney.

Braun died of Parkinson's and cancer in 2001 and is buried in Cincinnati's Spring Grove Cemetery. He was survived by his wife, Wray Jean, and three children: Rob, Doug, and Melissa. Rob later worked at WKRC-TV as its primary news anchorman.

== Filmography ==
- The Doctors (1970) Newspaper Reporter
- The Skin (1981) - (uncredited)
- Die Hard 2 (1990) - Newscaster (WZDC)
- Defending Your Life (1991) - Talk Show Host
