= List of television stations in Ohio =

This is a list of broadcast television stations that are licensed in the U.S. state of Ohio.

== Full-power ==
- Stations are arranged by media market served and channel position.

Full-power television stations in Ohio
Media market	Station	Channel	Primary affiliation(s)	Notes	Refs
Cincinnati	WLWT	5	NBC		
Cincinnati	WCPO-TV	9	ABC		
Cincinnati	WKRC-TV	12	CBS, The CW on 12.2		
Cincinnati	WPTO	14	PBS	(Note: Licensed to Oxford, Ohio.)	
Cincinnati	WXIX-TV	19	Fox	(Note: Licensed to Newport, Kentucky.)	
Cincinnati	WCET	48	PBS		
Cincinnati	WSTR-TV	64	MyNetworkTV		
Cleveland	WKYC	3	NBC		
Cleveland	WEWS-TV	5	ABC		
Cleveland	WJW	8	Fox		
Cleveland	WDLI-TV	17	Bounce TV	(Note: Licensed to Canton, Ohio.)	
Cleveland	WOIO	19	CBS	(Note: Licensed to Shaker Heights, Ohio.)	
Cleveland	WVPX-TV	23	Ion Television	(Note: Licensed to Akron, Ohio.)	
Cleveland	WVIZ	25	PBS		
Cleveland	WUAB	43	MyNetworkTV	(Note: Licensed to Lorain, Ohio.)	
Cleveland	WRLM	47	TCT		
Cleveland	WNEO	49	PBS	(Note: Satellite of WNEO.)	
Cleveland	WBNX-TV	55	The CW		
Cleveland	WQHS-DT	61	Univision		
Columbus	WCMH-TV	4	NBC		
Columbus	WSYX	6	ABC, MyNetwork on 6.2, Fox on 6.3		
Columbus	WBNS-TV	10	CBS		
Columbus	WTTE	28	Roar		
Columbus	WOSU-TV	34	PBS		
Columbus	WSFJ-TV	51	Bounce TV	(Note: Licensed to London, Ohio.)	
Columbus	WWHO	53	The CW	(Note: Licensed to Chillicothe, Ohio.)	
Dayton	WDTN	2	NBC		
Dayton	WHIO-TV	7	CBS		
Dayton	WPTD	16	PBS		
Dayton	WKEF	22	ABC, Fox on 22.2, MyNetworkTV on 22.3		
Dayton	WBDT	26	The CW	(Note: Licensed to Springfield, Ohio.)	
Dayton	WRGT-TV	45	Dabl		
Lima	WLIO	8	NBC, Fox and MyNetworkTV on 8.2		
Lima	WLMA	44	Religious independent		
Mansfield	WGGN-TV	52	Religious independent	(Note: Licensed to Sandusky, Ohio.)	
Mansfield	WMFD-TV	68	Independent		
Toledo	WTOL	11	CBS		
Toledo	WTVG	13	ABC, The CW on 13.2		
Toledo	WNWO-TV	24	NBC		
Toledo	WBGU-TV	27	PBS	(Note: Licensed to Bowling Green, Ohio.)	
Toledo	WGTE-TV	30	PBS		
Toledo	WUPW	36	Fox		
Toledo	WLMB	40	Religious independent		
Youngstown	WFMJ-TV	21	NBC, The CW on 21.2		
Youngstown	WKBN-TV	27	CBS, Fox on 27.2		
Youngstown	WYTV	33	ABC, MyNetworkTV on 33.2		
Youngstown	WNEO	45	PBS	(Note: Licensed to Alliance, Ohio.)	
Zanesville	WHIZ-TV	18	NBC, Fox and MyNetworkTV on 18.2		
Zanesville	WOUC-TV	44	PBS	(Note: Licensed to Cambridge, Ohio.) (Note: Satellite of WOUB-TV.)	
~Parkersburg, WV	WOUB-TV	20	PBS	(Note: Licensed to Athens, Ohio.)	
~Huntington, WV	WQCW	30	The CW	(Note: Licensed to Portsmouth, Ohio.)	
~Wheeling, WV	WTOV-TV	9	NBC, Fox on 9.2	(Note: Licensed to Steubenville, Ohio.)	

== Low-power ==
Low-power television stations in Ohio
Media market	Station	Channel	Primary affiliation(s)	Notes	Refs
Cincinnati	WBCQ-LD	25	Telemundo		
Cincinnati	WDYC-LD	36	Daystar		
Cleveland	WTCL-LD	6	Telemundo		
Cleveland	WIVX-LD	13	Various		
Cleveland	WRAP-LD	16	Various		
Cleveland	WQDI-LD	20	Various		
Cleveland	WOHZ-CD	22	Rock Entertainment Sports Network		
Cleveland	WUEK-LD	26	Various		
Cleveland	KONV-LD	28	Various		
Cleveland	WOCV-CD	35	Catchy Comedy		
Cleveland	WIVM-LD	39	Independent		
Cleveland	WEKA-LD	41	Various		
Cleveland	W13DS-D	48	Silent		
Cleveland	WCDN-LD	53	Daystar		
Columbus	WDEM-CD	17	Rock Entertainment Sports Network		
Columbus	WCLL-CD	19	Daystar		
Columbus	WCBZ-CD	22	Cozi TV		
Columbus	WQMC-LD	23	Urban One TV, Telemundo on 23.2		
Columbus	WXOH-LD	25	Univision		
Columbus	WOOH-LD	29	Various	(Note: Licensed to Zanesville, Ohio.)	
Columbus	WCSN-LD	32	Various		
Columbus	WOCB-CD	39	TCT	(Note: Licensed to Marion, Ohio.)	
Columbus	W17EB-D	44	HSN		
Dayton	WLWD-LD	20	Daystar		
Dayton	WZCD-LD	30	Rock Entertainment Sports Network		
Dayton	WRCX-LD	40	Independent		
Lima	WOHL-CD	35	ABC, CBS on 35.2		
Toledo	WFND-LD	19	BCSN Sports	(Note: Licensed to Findlay, Ohio.)	
Toledo	WDMY-LD	23	[Blank]		
Toledo	WMNT-CD	48	MyNetworkTV/Cozi TV		
Toledo	WDTJ-LD	68	Daystar		
Youngstown	WYFX-LD	62	Fox, MyNetworkTV on 62.2		
~Huntington, WV	WTZP-LD	50	Cozi TV		
~Wheeling, WV	W18EY-D	30	[Blank]		

== Translators ==
Television station translators in Ohio
Media market	Station	Channel	Translating	Notes	Refs
Cleveland	W28FG-D	6; 22	WTCL-LD; WOHZ-CD		
Cleveland	W27DG-D	13	WIVX-LD	(Note: Licensed to Millersburg, Ohio.)	
Cleveland	WOIO (DRT)	19; 43	WOIO; WUAB		
Cleveland	W34FP-D	25	WVIZ	(Note: Licensed to Eastlake, Ohio.)	
Cleveland	WIVD-LD	26	WIVM-LD		
Cleveland	WIVN-LD	29	WIVM-LD	(Note: Licensed to Massillon, Ohio.)	
Columbus	WXCB-CD	39	WOCB-CD	(Note: Licensed to Delaware, Ohio.)	
Columbus	WGCT-CD	39	WOCB-CD		
Dayton	W25FI-D	16	WPTD	(Note: Licensed to Maplewood, Ohio.)	
Lima	WPNM-LD	35	WOHL-CD	(Note: Licensed to Leipsic, Ohio.)	
Lima	WAMS-LD	35	WOHL-CD	(Note: Licensed to Minster and New Bremen, Ohio.)	
Lima	WTLW-LD	44	WLMA		
Lima	WOHW-LD	44	WLMA		
Mansfield	W18ES-D	34	WOSU-TV		
Mansfield	WQIZ-LD	48	WOCB-CD	(Note: Licensed to Ashland, Ohio.)	
Youngstown	W13DP-D	45	WNEO		

== Defunct ==
- WCOM Mansfield (1988–1989)
- WGSF Newark (1963–1976)
- WICA-TV Ashtabula (1953–1956, 1965–1967)
- WKBF-TV Cleveland (1968–1975)
- WKTR-TV Kettering (1967–1970)
- WPBO Portsmouth (1973–2017)
- WSWO-TV Springfield (1968–1970, 1972)
- WRLO Portsmouth (1966–1968 or 1969)
- WUXA Portsmouth (1988–1989)
- WXTV Youngstown (1960–1962)
