= Miami Valley =

Geographic region in Ohio, US

Coordinates: 39°46′07″N 84°11′23″W

Map of counties in the Miami Valley

The Miami Valley is the region surrounding the Great Miami River in southwestern Ohio, United States. It also includes the Little Miami, Mad, and Stillwater rivers. The region includes the cities of Dayton, Hamilton, Springfield, and Middletown, among other communities. The river's name is derived from the Miami people. The name lends itself to many institutions and enterprises in the area, such as Miami University, Miami Valley Career Technology Center, the Miami Valley Conference, Miami Valley Today, Premier Health Miami Valley Hospital, and the Miami Valley Council of Boy Scouts of America.

== History ==
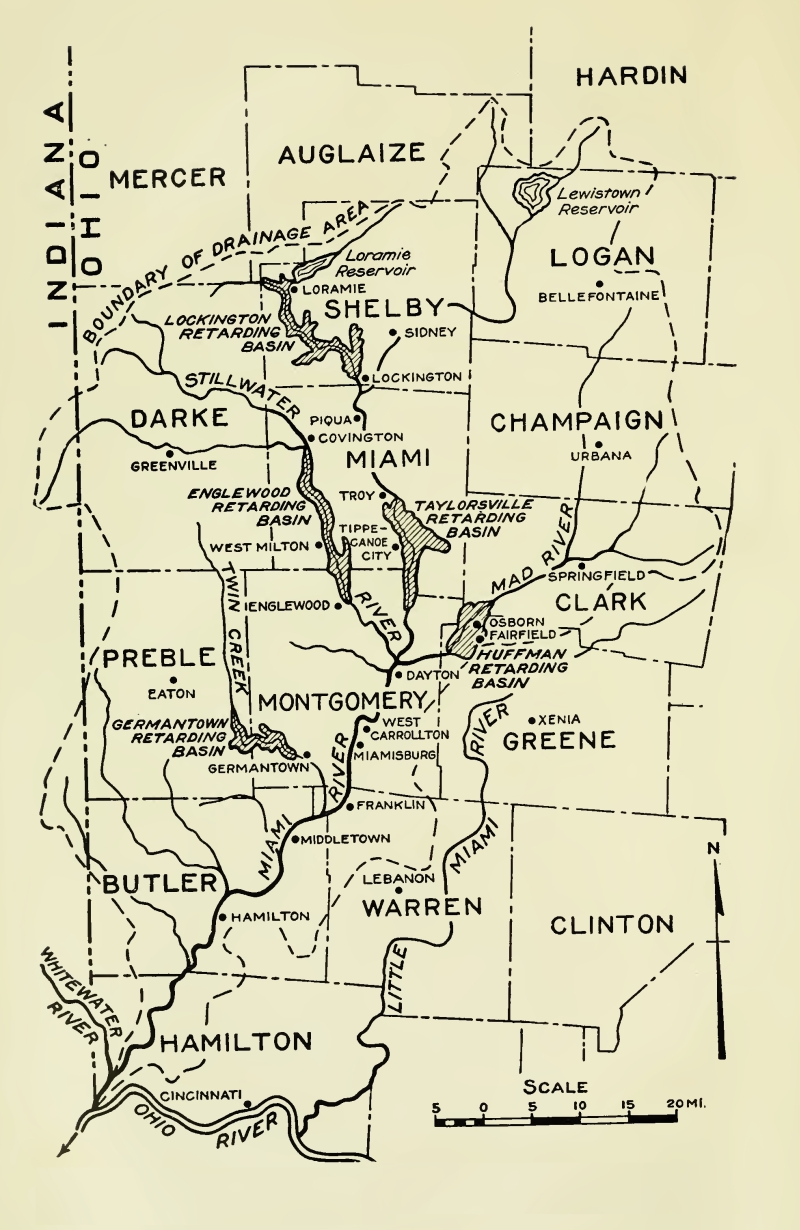
Map of Miami Valley (1919)

During the mid-twentieth century, among the largest employers in the Valley were Procter & Gamble in Cincinnati, Champion Paper and Fiber in Hamilton, Armco in Middletown, and National Cash Register in Dayton.

== Counties and cities ==
Local television stations WDTN, Think^{TV} (WPTD and WPTO), WHIO-TV, WKEF and WRGT include the following counties and cities in the cultural Miami Valley:

- Montgomery County (Dayton)
- Greene County (Xenia)
- Preble County (Eaton)
- Clark County (Springfield)
- Miami County (Troy)
- Darke County (Greenville)
- Champaign County (Urbana)
- Shelby County (Sidney)
- Logan County (Bellefontaine)
- Butler County (Hamilton)
- Warren County (Lebanon)
- Wayne County, Indiana (Richmond)
- Mercer County (Celina)
- Auglaize County (Wapakoneta)

Additionally, WHIO includes the following locations in its news and weather coverage:

- Clinton County (Wilmington)
- Union County, Indiana (Liberty)
- Randolph County, Indiana (Winchester)

== Demographics ==
As Greater Cincinnati grows northward through Butler County, it could conceivably merge with Greater Dayton by 2030, thereby virtually erasing any boundary between the two current Combined Statistical Areas (CSA). As a result, the US Census Bureau could begin reporting the Cincinnati and Dayton metropolitan areas as one by that time, though it would be up to the U.S. Office of Management and Budget to make the merger decision. The new Cincinnati–Dayton metropolitan area would be comparable in size to that of the Orlando–Deltona–Daytona Beach, FL CSA and place it within the top 20 most populous metros in the US, with a population of nearly 3.0 million.

== Transportation ==
=== Transit ===
- Butler County Regional Transit Authority - Primarily serves Hamilton, Middletown and Oxford
- Greater Dayton Regional Transit Authority
- Greene CATS Public Transit - Serves Xenia
- Rose View Transit - Serves Richmond, IN
- Springfield City Area Transit

=== Major highways ===
- Interstate 75 - Chrysler Expressway; Runs north to south along the valley and through downtown Dayton.
- Interstate 70 - Traverses the valley from east to west.
- Interstate 71 - 3C Highway; Runs north to south along the eastern half of the Miami Valley.
- Interstate 675 - Bypasses Dayton from I-75 south of the city to I-70 east of it.
- U.S. Route 35 - Cross-Dayton Expressway; Runs east to west through the Dayton metro area.
- U.S. Route 68 - Runs north to south through farmlands in the eastern Miami Valley.
- U.S. Route 127 - Runs north to south through several cities and rural communities in the western Miami Valley.
- Ohio State Route 129 - Connects Hamilton to I-75.
- Ohio State Route 49 - Forms a bypass west of Dayton and continues north into Darke County.

== See also ==
- Dayton metropolitan area
