= WKOI-TV =

Television station in Richmond, Indiana

- Richmond, Indiana; Dayton, Ohio; United States
- City: Richmond, Indiana
- Channels: Digital: 31 (UHF), shared with WDTN and WBDT; Virtual: 43
- Branding: Ion Television

Programming
- Affiliations: 43.1: Ion Television

Ownership
- Owner: Ion Media; (Ion Television License, LLC)

History
- First air date: May 11, 1982
- Former call signs: WKOI (1982–2003)
- Former channel numbers: Analog: 43 (UHF, 1982–2009); Digital: 39 (UHF, until 2018); 50 (UHF, 2018–2019)
- Former affiliations: Independent (1982–1986); TBN (1986–2018)
- Call sign meaning: Station formerly served a tri-state region of Kentucky, Ohio and Indiana during its Cincinnati market era

Technical information
- Licensing authority: FCC
- Facility ID: 67869
- ERP: 1,000 kW
- HAAT: 330 m (1,083 ft)
- Transmitter coordinates: 39°43′8″N 84°15′21.1″W

Links
- Public license information: Public file; LMS
- Website: iontelevision.com

WKOI-TV (channel 43) is a television station licensed to Richmond, Indiana, United States, broadcasting the Ion Television network to the Dayton, Ohio, area. The station is owned by the Ion Media subsidiary of the E. W. Scripps Company. Transmission facilities are provided by unrelated NBC affiliate WDTN (channel 2), which shares its digital channel with WKOI-TV through a channel sharing agreement, along with WDTN's sister station, WBDT (channel 26), a de facto O&O of The CW; the transmitter is located on Frytown Road in southwest Dayton. For regulatory purposes, WKOI's "main studio" facility is located at Scripps Center in downtown Cincinnati (along with many other Ion stations).

== History ==
WKOI-TV signed on May 11, 1982, as an independent station airing religious programming. In 1986, it was purchased by the Trinity Broadcasting Network (TBN). As a TBN O&O, the station cleared almost all of the network's programming, only breaking away from the network once a week for local community public affairs programming.

Until June 7, 2018, WKOI-TV's transmitter was located on SR 73 in Milford Township, Butler County, Ohio, near Collinsville, approximately halfway between Richmond and Cincinnati. It thus served as the TBN station for Northern Kentucky, East Central Indiana and a large swath of southwestern Ohio (Greater Cincinnati and the Miami Valley). Even though its transmitter was based within the Cincinnati television market, its city of license, Richmond, is in the Dayton market. Thus, Nielsen counted the station as part of the Dayton market.

TBN entered into an option agreement with Ion Media on November 14, 2017, which gave Ion the option to acquire the licenses of WKOI-TV and three other TBN stations that had sold their spectrum in the Federal Communications Commission (FCC)'s incentive auction; Ion exercised the option on May 24, 2018. The sale was completed on September 25, 2018.

== Technical information ==
=== Subchannels ===
Subchannels of WDTN, WBDT, and WKOI-TV
License	Subchannel	Res.	Short name	Programming
WDTN	2.1	1080i	WDTN HD	NBC
WDTN	2.2	480i	ESCAPE	Ion Mystery
WDTN	45.4	480i	Charge!	Charge! (WRGT-TV)
WBDT	26.1	1080i	WBDT HD	The CW
WBDT	26.2	480i	Bounce	Bounce TV
WKOI-TV	43.1	480i	ION TV	Ion

Broadcast on behalf of another station

=== Analog-to-digital conversion ===
WKOI-TV (along with all other TBN-owned full-power stations) shut down its analog signal, over UHF channel 43, on April 16, 2009. The station's digital signal remained on its pre-transition UHF channel 39, using virtual channel 43. The station's signal was multiplexed, carrying TBN on 43.1, The Church Channel on 43.2, JCTV on 43.3, Enlace on 43.4 and Smile of a Child on 43.5. Later, The Church Channel became Hillsong Channel, JCTV became JUCE TV and was combined on 43.3 with Smile, and TBN Salsa was added on 43.5.

=== Spectrum sale and channel sharing agreement ===
On April 14, 2017, it was reported that WKOI-TV's over-the-air spectrum had been sold in the FCC's spectrum reallocation auction, fetching just over $20 million, with the station expected to go off the air. On March 22, 2018, it was announced that WKOI-TV would share spectrum with unrelated NBC affiliate WDTN.

On June 7, 2018, WKOI-TV began sharing WDTN's digital channel, with all TBN channels dropped, and Ion Television programming appearing on virtual channel 43.1. WDTN also continued to carry Ion Television on virtual channel 2.3, as it had since February 1, 2018; on June 29, 2018, when WDTN's sister station WBDT also began sharing WDTN's digital signal, virtual channel 2.3 was dropped.

=== Former translators ===
WKOI-TV's programming was previously relayed on W20CL (channel 20) in Springfield, Ohio, and W36DG (channel 36) in Cincinnati. A deal was reached to sell W20CL (now WLWD-LD in Dayton) to Word of God Fellowship, owner of the Daystar Television Network, on March 19, 2010; W36DG was also sold to Daystar, and is now WDYC-LD.

== See also ==
- Channel 31 digital TV stations in the United States
- Channel 43 virtual TV stations in the United States
- List of television stations in Ohio
- List of television stations in Ohio (by channel number)
- List of television stations in the United States by call sign (initial letter W)
