= WGCT =

WGCT may refer to:

- WGCT-CD, a television station (channel 8, virtual 39) licensed to serve Columbus, Ohio, United States
- WGCT-LP, a defunct television station (channel 17) licensed to serve Yankeetown, Florida, United States
- WGCT-LD, a television station (channel 19) licensed to serve Tampa, Florida, United States
- WTBT-LD, a television station (channel 27, virtual 45) licensed to serve Tampa, Florida, which held the call sign WGCT-LP or WGCT-LD from 2007 to 2012
