= WLWT TV Tower =

- Location within the United States

General information
- Status: Completed
- Type: Steel lattice television tower
- Location: Cincinnati, Ohio
- Coordinates: 39°07′27″N 84°31′18″W
- Completed: 1978

Height
- Height: 289.6 m (950 ft)

The WLWT TV Tower is a free-standing lattice tower with triangular cross section used by WLWT located on Chickasaw Street in the Clifton Heights neighborhood of Cincinnati, Ohio. It stands 289.6 m (950 ft) tall, one of four that rise above 900 feet in the city and is among the tallest lattice towers in the world. It was built in 1978, replacing the original 570-foot tall WLWT tower built in 1948 at the same site.

== Stations ==
=== Television ===
TV stations that transmit from WLWT TV Tower include the following:

Callsign	Virtual Channel	Physical Channel	Affiliation	Digital channels
WLWT-TV	5	5	NBC	20
WCET-TV	48	17	PBS	48
WPTO-TV				

== See also ==
- Lattice tower
- List of tallest freestanding steel structures
