= Fox 45 =

Fox 45 may refer to one of the following television stations in the United States affiliated with the Fox Broadcasting Company:

- WBFF in Baltimore, Maryland
- WKEF-DT2, a digital subchannel of WKEF in Dayton, Ohio
