= WSWO-TV =

Television station in Springfield, Ohio (1968–1972)

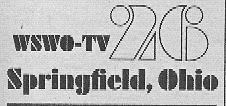
- Springfield, Ohio; United States
- Channels: Analog: 26 (UHF)

Programming
- Affiliations: Independent

Ownership
- Owner: Lester W. White

History
- First air date: July 14, 1968
- Last air date: December 6, 1972
- Call sign meaning: Southwestern Ohio

Technical information
- ERP: 724 kW
- HAAT: 149 m (488 ft)
- Transmitter coordinates: 39°54′33″N 83°51′36″W

WSWO-TV (channel 26) was a television station in Springfield, Ohio, United States, which operated from 1968 to 1970 and for less than six months in 1972. An independent station for its entire existence, WSWO-TV continually suffered from financial difficulties, both times failing for that reason.

== History ==
=== First era ===
The Federal Communications Commission (FCC) granted Southwestern Ohio Television, Inc., a construction permit for a new television station to operate on channel 66 in Springfield on September 15, 1965. The 1965 UHF allocations revision, in Docket 14229, changed the channel from 66 to 26.

WSWO-TV signed on July 14, 1968, at 3 p.m. Channel 26's programming would be primarily syndicated fare as opposed to the movie-heavy lineup on WKTR-TV (channel 16). The station's programming included a local live version of Bozo the Clown (portrayed by announcer Dave Eaton, formerly of WKTR-TV). There were also two daily newscasts.

On January 1, 1970, ABC moved its Dayton affiliation to WKTR-TV. However, in the face of a massive bribery scandal involving the station, the network announced in March that it would rescind WKTR-TV's contract and invited all three Dayton UHF stations—WKTR-TV, previous affiliate WKEF (channel 22), and eventually WSWO-TV—to pitch the network. The network later rescinded its invitation to WKTR-TV. In early May, a federal injunction awarded a 70-percent share of the ABC affiliation back to WKEF, as it had previously held prior to 1970 when WLWD held the remaining 30 percent; the order was then revised two weeks later to give the entire affiliation to WKEF.

Channel 26 held out as its bid for ABC affiliation, along with that of WKEF, remained pending with the network. However, financial problems had emerged by late May, when the station cut its broadcast hours, laid off 17 of its 37 employees, and canceled its movie matinee and Bozo's Big Top programs for lack of commercial support. Southwestern Ohio Television, Inc., advertised an offering of new shares in the company.

On June 16, ABC selected WKEF to be its full affiliate for the Dayton market, giving it first call rights to all ABC shows for the first time in station history. Three days later, on June 19, WSWO-TV went off the air, citing "severely declining revenue" and saying its inability to secure the affiliation was the last straw; an employee was quoted as saying that president Joseph Sheridan instructed the board to close channel 26 as soon as the affiliation went to WKEF. Three weeks later, Southwestern Ohio Television presented a bankruptcy petition.

=== Lester White ownership ===
In 1972, bankruptcy trustee Thomas Taggart sold WSWO-TV for $452,184 to Lester White. White owned a Springfield-based production firm, Mid-American Teleproductions, which had fed sports broadcasts to major networks; Mid-American rented studios and offices from WSWO for its own use. Nearly two years to the day of signing off, WSWO returned to southwest Ohio screens on June 17, 1972. The station broadcast in color when it returned to the air. Programming included live wrestling from the studios alongside a heavy diet of local sports programming, as well as a 10 p.m. local newscast, several ABC network shows, and two shows to be hosted by White. The local newscast was noteworthy for being anchored by a Black man, 21-year-old news director Oney Temple, one of the first Black news anchors in the Midwest.

However, it took scarcely over a month for the first cutbacks to begin at the newly relaunched channel 26. In late July, it laid off some staff and moved its afternoon sign-on from 1:30 to 3 p.m. The local newscast was canceled after the August 18 edition, unable to compete with Dayton stations and having lost its news and sports directors. White fired more than half the staff in August, arguing they were not doing the job.

In November 1972, WSWO-TV began producing another local newscast—this time, a 9 p.m. report hosted by Dave Shannon, who moved to Springfield from Toledo—and a local women's program, The Rosemary Powell Show. By this time, however, staff was so thin that station owner White doubled as the weather presenter, and the report was panned for having old sports information; Dayton Daily News television columnist Tom Hopkins noted that channel 26 was becoming "nationally famous" for technical problems and blunders.

On December 2, television station WHIZ-TV in Zanesville reported the theft of $50,000 of equipment which had been taken when someone broke into the station after the close of business on Friday. White was arrested after police found the equipment at the WSWO offices and in a rented airplane hangar at the Springfield municipal airport. Local authorities also recovered in Springfield the truck that had been used to transport the equipment from Zanesville.

On December 6, WSWO-TV left the air for good after White's companies defaulted on more than $50,000 in loans made by First National Bank of Springfield. The bank obtained a court order to padlock the doors of the television station and force it off the air, which was executed by the Clark County Sheriff's Office. It was the second failure of a station in the region in 18 months; in 1971, WKTR-TV had closed as a result of fallout from the ABC bribery scandal.

With WSWO-TV dark, White's legal problems were only beginning. On December 13, White was taken from the Clark County jail to Muskingum County, to face additional charges related to the break-in. The Zanesville station recovered most of the equipment, though some of it had been damaged and rendered inoperable, according to WHIZ's chief engineer. The grand jury in Muskingum County indicted White in January 1973; White posted a combined $55,000 bond to the two counties to be released from jail. However, when White's Clark County trial was due to begin on January 31, he failed to show up, and his arrest was ordered again.

White turned up three weeks later in Nashville, Tennessee, where he was arrested for driving an allegedly stolen car. In September, he pleaded guilty in Tennessee to charges regarding additional stolen equipment, namely a color camera valued at $5,000 that had been stolen in February 1972 from WLYH-TV of Lebanon, Pennsylvania. In pleading guilty in Tennessee, he admitted to the FBI that he had sold some of the WHIZ equipment to KOTV of Tulsa, Oklahoma, and had accepted a down payment on a video tape recorder he did not have from the campus TV station at Brigham Young University in Provo, Utah. Two months later, he was sentenced to a prison term of one to 20 years by Ohio authorities, to be served concurrently with a four-year sentence issued in Tennessee.

Much of the equipment used in operating WSWO-TV—and that was not stolen—was sold off to satisfy creditors. The studio facility and tower were acquired in 1978 by the Miami Valley Christian Broadcasting Association, which held a new channel 26 construction permit.
