= John Knoepfle =

American poet, translator, and educator (1923–2019)

John Ignatius Knoepfle (February 4, 1923 – November 16, 2019) was an American poet, translator, and educator, principally at Sangamon State University, who is credited with helping to revive Midwestern poetry in the 1960s. He also served in the United States Navy during World War II and participated in the civil rights and antiwar movements.

== Early life ==
Knoepfle was born in Cincinnati on February 4, 1923, as the youngest of four brothers in a Swiss-Irish Catholic family. He graduated from St. Xavier High School in 1941.

== Military service ==
Knoepfle had begun his first year studying English at Xavier University when the United States entered World War II. He continued studying at Xavier under the V-12 Navy College Training Program, then enlisted on December 12, 1942. He took classes at Dartmouth College while undergoing basic training.

Knoepfle was commissioned in June 1944 and posted to Plattsburg, New York, as a small boat officer. He was transferred to Naval Amphibious Base Coronado and assigned to the USS Deuel. He transported Marines aboard Higgins boats at the battles of Iwo Jima and Okinawa. While he awaited a surgery for a leg injury sustained at Iwo Jima, he completed his studies at Xavier University. He was discharged in July 1946 and awarded the Purple Heart for his injury.

== Career ==
After the war, Knoepfle received his Ph.B. in 1947 and M.A. in 1949 from Xavier University. He worked as a producer and director at the public television station WCET in Cincinnati from 1954 to 1955. He received a Ph.D. from Saint Louis University in 1967.

Knoepfle taught English at the Southern Illinois University East St. Louis Center from 1957 to 1961, as well as at St. Louis University High School and Ohio State University. He was assistant professor of English at Maryville College of the Sacred Heart from 1961 to 1965 and also taught at Washington University in St. Louis. He served as director of creative writing at Saint Louis University from 1966 to 1972 and as professor of literature at Sangamon State University from 1972 to 1991.

== Activism and social work ==
John Knoepfle and his wife Margaret were active in social justice and antiwar movements for more than 50 years. John Knoepfle took a bus to Alabama in 1963 as a Freedom Rider. They both marched in protests against the Vietnam War during the 1960s and held weekly antiwar vigils outside the Federal Building in Springfield.

Knoepfle served as a consultant for Upward Bound, the federal program for poor and at-risk high school students, from 1965 to 1970.

== Personal life ==
Knoepfle married Peggy Sower in Cincinnati on December 26, 1956. They had five children and four grandchildren. They lived in Auburn, Illinois, for 30 years, then moved in 2002 to Springfield, where he died on November 16, 2019.

== Published works ==
Knoepfle published more than 25 books over his 50-year career, including Rivers Into Islands (1965), Poems from the Sangamon (1985), and Begging An Amnesty (1994). From 1954 to 1960, Knoepfle recorded "The Knoepfle Collection", a series of 50 hourlong interviews of steamboat men along the Ohio and Mississippi rivers.

With Wang Shouyi, Knoepfle translated Chinese poetry from the Tang and Song dynasties into English; these translations also circulated within China.

== Awards ==
Knoepfle received many awards for his writing, including:

- Mark Twain Award for Distinguished Contributions to Midwestern Literature (1986), Society for the Study of Midwestern Literature at Michigan State University
- Illinois Writer of the Year (1986), Illinois Association of Teachers of English
- Literary Heritage Award (1995), Illinois Center for the Book
- Doctor of Humane Letters (1996), Maryville University
- Doctor of Humane Letters (1999), Springfield College in Illinois
- WILL Award Signaling Excellence in the Arts (2002), University of Illinois at Urbana–Champaign
- President's Award for Exemplary Achievement in the Literary Arts (2004), Poets and Writers Literary Forum, Springfield
