= Billy McCool =

American baseball player (1944–2014)

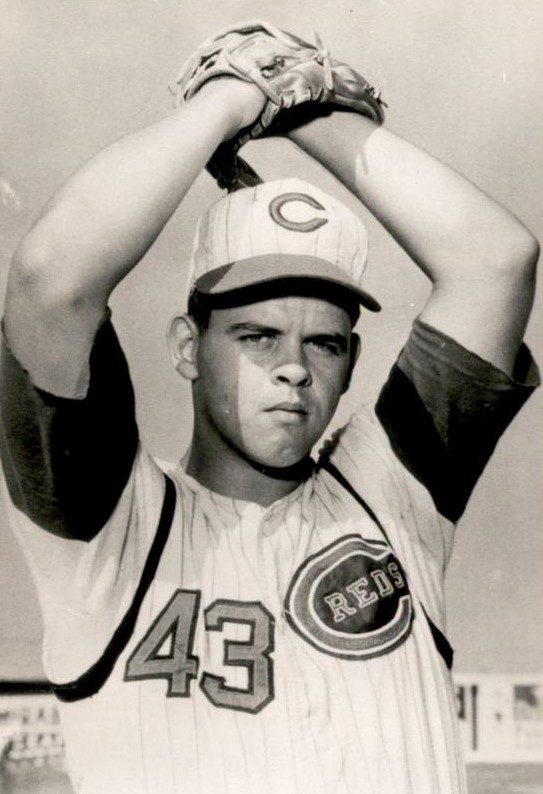
- Pitcher
- Born: July 14, 1944; Batesville, Indiana, U.S.
- Died: June 8, 2014 (aged 69); Summerfield, Florida, U.S.
- Batted: Right Threw: Left

MLB debut
- April 24, 1964, for the Cincinnati Reds

Last MLB appearance
- July 8, 1970, for the St. Louis Cardinals

MLB statistics
- Win–loss record: 32–42
- Earned run average: 3.59
- Strikeouts: 471
- Saves: 58
- Stats at Baseball Reference

Teams
- Cincinnati Reds (1964–1968); San Diego Padres (1969); St. Louis Cardinals (1970)

Career highlights and awards
- All-Star (1966)

William John McCool (July 14, 1944 – June 8, 2014) was an American professional baseball pitcher who played seven seasons in Major League Baseball (MLB), mostly with the Cincinnati Reds. He also spent a year each with the San Diego Padres and St. Louis Cardinals.

Born in Batesville, Indiana, McCool went to nearby Lawrenceburg High School in Lawrenceburg, where the McCools lived. He graduated from LHS in 1962 and was signed by the Reds as an amateur free agent in 1963.

He started his pro career in 1963, playing Class-D ball for the Reds organization in Tampa, Florida and later that year made the jump to the then-Triple-A San Diego Padres. He was listed as 6 feet 2 inches (1.88 m) tall and 195 pounds (88 kg).

He made his major league debut at the young age of 19 on April 24, 1964. The first batter he faced was Jesús Alou (who singled) as McCool pitched two innings in relief of Al Worthington in a 15-5 Reds loss to the San Francisco Giants at Cincinnati's Crosley Field. That year he was named The Sporting News National League Rookie Pitcher of the Year.

In 1965 and 1966 he was second in the National League in saves and in 1966 he was named a National League All-Star. He appeared in a career-high 62 games in 1965.

He was among the players drafted by the San Diego Padres in the 1968 MLB expansion draft. He appeared in 54 games for the Padres in their inaugural season of 1969. Just prior to the 1970 season he was traded to the Cardinals, with whom he pitched 18 games. In the offseason after the 1970 season (which would be his last in the majors, at age 25), he was traded to the Boston Red Sox and later to the Kansas City Royals, but he did not appear for either team in the majors.

After retiring from baseball in 1970 McCool moved to Centerville, Ohio where he raised his family. He worked for three years (1972–74) as a sports anchor for WKEF-TV in Dayton. McCool's book, The Billy McCool Pitching Digest: A Guide to Effective Baseball Pitching, was published in 1977. He lived in Summerfield, Florida after retiring in 2004. In 2013, he was inducted into the Indiana Baseball Hall of Fame as a 1962 graduate of Lawrenceburg High School.

McCool had a long battle with heart problems and had first been diagnosed with hypertension when he was in his 20s, then years later had triple-bypass heart surgery when he was 45.

He died in his Summerfield, Florida home as the result of the heart condition on June 8, 2014.
