= Public Media Connect =

USA public television company

Public Media Connect, Inc. is a non-profit organization that owns southwest Ohio's largest PBS member television stations. It was formed in 2009 from the merger of the Greater Cincinnati Television Educational Foundation, which operates WCET in Cincinnati under the "CET" brand, and Greater Dayton Public Television, whose "ThinkTV" brand is shared by WPTD in Dayton and WPTO in Oxford, along with a translator (W25FI-D) in Maplewood. CET and ThinkTV continue to operate as subsidiary non-profits under the Public Media Connect umbrella organization. Combined, the three stations serve a potential audience of 3.3 million people in Ohio, Kentucky and Indiana.

Until July 2010, the three stations maintained separate production and control staff. In July 2010, master control for both stations was centralized in Dayton, in order to reduce costs. They continue to maintain distinct program schedules and conduct separate fundraising efforts. Public Media Connect enables the stations to pool resources, again saving scarce financial and personnel resources from unnecessary duplication.

== See also ==
- Cincinnati Public Radio Inc.
