= Channel 45 branded TV stations in the United States =

The following television stations in the United States brand as channel 45 (though neither using virtual channel 45 nor broadcasting on physical RF channel 45):

- WKEF-DT2 in Dayton, Ohio
- KSTC-TV in Saint Paul, Minnesota
