= WBDT =

Television station in Springfield, Ohio

- Springfield–Dayton, Ohio; United States
- City: Springfield, Ohio
- Channels: Digital: 31 (UHF), shared with WDTN and WKOI-TV; Virtual: 26
- Branding: Dayton's CW; 2 News

Programming
- Affiliations: 26.1: The CW; 26.2: Bounce TV

Ownership
- Owner: Vaughan Media; (WBDT Television, LLC)
- Operator: Nexstar Media Group
- Sister stations: WDTN

History
- First air date: September 7, 1980
- Former call signs: WTJC (1980–1998); WDPX (1998–1999)
- Former channel numbers: Analog: 26 (UHF, 1980–2009); Digital: 18 (UHF, until 2009), 26 (UHF, 2009–2018), 50 (UHF, 2018–2019)
- Former affiliations: Independent (1980–1998); Pax (primary 1998–1999, secondary 1999–2004); The WB (1999–2006)
- Call sign meaning: "The WB, Dayton"

Technical information
- Licensing authority: FCC
- Facility ID: 70138
- ERP: 1,000 kW
- HAAT: 330 m (1,083 ft)
- Transmitter coordinates: 39°43′8″N 84°15′21.1″W

Links
- Public license information: Public file; LMS
- Website: www.wdtn.com/daytons-cw

WBDT (channel 26) is a television station licensed to Springfield, Ohio, United States, serving as the Dayton area outlet for The CW. It is owned by Vaughan Media and operated by Nexstar Media Group under a local marketing agreement (LMA), making it sister to NBC affiliate WDTN (channel 2). The two stations share studios on South Dixie Drive in Moraine, Ohio. Through a channel sharing agreement, WBDT, along with Richmond, Indiana–licensed Ion Television station WKOI-TV (channel 43), share WDTN's digital channel from WDTN's transmitter facility on Frytown Road in southwest Dayton.

WBDT serves as the default CW affiliate for the Lima market, which had been served by cable-only affiliate West Central Ohio CW until early 2010.

== History ==
=== History of channel 26 ===
Channel 26 first appeared in southwest Ohio on July 14, 1968, as independent WSWO-TV, under the ownership of Southwestern Ohio Television. WSWO-TV ran a local live version of Bozo the Clown (portrayed by announcer Dave Eaton, who was previously with the former WKTR-TV in Kettering, now PBS member station WPTD [channel 16]), as well as other local shows. The station suddenly went dark on June 19, 1970, after it lost a bid to obtain the ABC affiliation for Dayton to WKEF (channel 22); it soon thereafter filed for bankruptcy.

WSWO-TV briefly returned to the air on June 17, 1972, under the ownership of Lester W. White, but fell silent again at the beginning of December after White defaulted on a loan. White was additionally discovered to have stolen equipment from multiple television stations, most notably WHIZ-TV in Zanesville, and arrested two days before a court ordered the station closed.

=== Current license ===
The current incarnation of channel 26 dates from September 7, 1980, when Miami Valley Christian Television (MVCT) returned it to the air as a Christian-oriented station under the call sign WTJC (for "Witnessing 'Til Jesus Comes"). WTJC aired religious programming during most of its daytime and weekend schedule (including The 700 Club, PTL and Jerry Falwell), although it also aired lifestyle programming such as The Joy of Gardening, cartoons, and children's programming in late weekday afternoon slots. There were also family-friendly reruns in early evenings and a local newscast. WTJC's Saturday schedule included westerns, sportsmen/hunting/wildlife shows, and The Lawrence Welk Show.

When WRGT-TV signed on in 1984, MVCT sold most of its secular programming inventory to that station, and switched WTJC to a mostly-religious format (with the exception of a few children's shows, and Saturday morning sporting and hunting shows). Over the next few years, several ministries that bought time on WTJC became involved in scandals. Due to the scandals, donations to the ministries, and to MVCT, declined. The primary owner of MVCT, Marvin Sparks, bought out his partners' shares in 1991 and in turn sold them to Video Mall Communications. WTJC then aired home shopping and paid programming eighteen hours a day, with religious shows the rest of the broadcast day.

In the mid-1990s, Abry Communications (which had purchased WRGT-TV's owner, Act III Broadcasting) approached MVCT with a proposal to manage WTJC for 18 hours a day. MVCT declined and chose instead to sell the station to Paxson Communications in 1995. Paxson kept a similar lineup for WTJC, airing religious programming in early mornings, infomercials for most of the day and worship music overnight. On January 20, 1998, WTJC's call sign was changed to WDPX (for "Dayton Pax TV"). Accordingly, on August 31 of that year, the station became a charter affiliate of Pax (now Ion Television).

In June 1999, Paxson sold the station to ACME Communications, which dropped half of Pax's programming for a primary affiliation with The WB, along with syndicated programming. The previous WB affiliate was low-power station WUCT-LP (now WRCX-LD); WB programming in the Dayton area could also be seen on the WGN cable channel and on Columbus WB affiliate WWHO. On June 9, 1999, ACME also changed WDPX's call sign to the current WBDT. ACME ran the station as a dual WB and Pax affiliate, signing a five-year affiliation deal with Pax upon the sale of the station from Paxson. As a dual WB and Pax affiliate, WBDT aired a mix of syndicated, WB and Pax TV programming. WBDT maintained a secondary affiliation with Pax until mid-2004 at the latest, airing its prime time lineup on weekday mornings from 9 a.m. to noon, early Sunday mornings from 1 to 4 a.m., and early Monday mornings from midnight to 4 a.m. In the station's early days as a WB affiliate, Pax's flagship Touched by an Angel continued to air at its regularly scheduled time of 7 p.m., leading into WB prime time programming. In 2004, Diagnosis: Murder was moved to 1 p.m., while the remainder of Pax's programming was moved to overnights. The station finally dropped the remainder of Pax's programming in September 2004, filling the morning hours previously programmed with the network's programming with off-network sitcoms, talk shows, infomercials, and court shows.

On September 18, 2006, WBDT became the market's CW outlet after The WB and UPN merged. It became a strong affiliate with the new network in terms of prime time ratings—strong enough for The CW to designate WBDT the "#1 CW affiliate" in the nation in March 2007. In that same month, the station became the first in the area (and one of the few in the entire country) to broadcast in a 1080i high definition 16:9 format 24 hours a day, broadcasting on digital UHF channel 18.

On June 4, 2010, it was announced that the LIN TV Corporation (owner of WDTN) would begin to operate WBDT through shared service and joint sales agreements. WBDT was to leave its longtime studios on Corporate Place, off Byers Road in Miamisburg, in October and move to WDTN's facility in Moraine. As of January 27, 2013, the former WBDT studio facility is now occupied by Sinclair Broadcast Group's virtual duopoly of ABC affiliate WKEF and Fox affiliate WRGT-TV (the move made them the last network-affiliated stations in Dayton to have upgraded their local programming, including newscasts, to high definition).

Three months after ACME and LIN TV reached their operations and sales agreements, LIN TV exercised an option to purchase WBDT along with another LIN TV-operated ACME station, fellow CW affiliate WCWF in Green Bay, Wisconsin. LIN TV requested that WBDT's license be assigned to a subsidiary of Vaughan Media (owner of CW affiliate KNVA in Austin, Texas, which was also operated by LIN TV). LIN TV held a 4.5% equity stake in Vaughan Media, but controlled most of that company's voting stock, effectively making it a shell corporation for LIN TV. The FCC approved the sale and license transfer in April 2011; the commission also denied objections from area cable operators Time Warner Cable and Buckeye Cablevision, who claimed that retransmission fees for WBDT would increase as a result of the sale. The sale of WBDT was consummated on May 20, 2011.

On March 21, 2014, Media General announced that it would purchase LIN Media and its stations, including WDTN and the SSA and JSA with WBDT, in a $1.6 billion merger. The FCC approved the merger on December 12, 2014, but a condition of the deal required Media General to end the JSA between WBDT and WDTN due to tighter scrutiny of such deals by the FCC. Media General received a two-year waiver to end the JSA between WDTN and WBDT. The merger was completed on December 19.

== Newscasts ==
On October 5, 1981, WTJC debuted its first newscast called Springfield Newswatch, after 10 years of not having a full news service in the area. It ran for a half-hour with local news, weather, and sports. The newscast was cut from the channel on July 12, 1982, due to its 10-month trial period ending.

On September 16, 2002, the nationally syndicated morning show The Daily Buzz premiered from WBDT's studios. The program, then produced by then-parent ACME Communications, remained based at the station until its August 2004 move to the facilities of former sister station WKCF in Lake Mary, Florida, near Orlando.

On August 20, 2007, WDTN began to produce a nightly half-hour prime time newscast for WBDT known as 2 News at 10 on Dayton's CW. On the 26th day of its broadcast, this show achieved higher ratings than WRGT-TV's nightly prime time news (produced by WKEF) in Dayton's metered market households.

On July 21, 2012, WDTN began broadcasting its local newscasts in high definition. The WBDT shows were included in the upgrade.

On January 7, 2013, WBDT began airing a weekday news program from 7 to 9 a.m., called 2 News Today on Dayton's CW. Since the cancellation of The Daily Buzz, the station also simulcasts the 5 to 7 a.m. WDTN edition as well. On September 9, 2013, WBDT expanded the prime time 10 p.m. WDTN-produced newscast to an hour.

== Technical information ==
=== Subchannels ===
The station's signal is multiplexed:

Subchannels of WDTN, WBDT, and WKOI-TV
License	Subchannel	Res.	Short name	Programming
WDTN	2.1	1080i	WDTN HD	NBC
WDTN	2.2	480i	ESCAPE	Ion Mystery
WDTN	45.4	480i	Charge!	Charge! (WRGT-TV)
WBDT	26.1	1080i	WBDT HD	The CW
WBDT	26.2	480i	Bounce	Bounce TV
WKOI-TV	43.1	480i	ION TV	Ion

Broadcast on behalf of another station

=== Analog-to-digital conversion ===
WBDT shut down its analog signal, over UHF channel 26, on June 12, 2009, the official date on which full-power television stations in the United States transitioned from analog to digital broadcasts under federal mandate. The station's digital signal relocated from its pre-transition UHF channel 18 to channel 26 for post-transition operations.

Initially, WBDT aired a standard definition simulcast of its HD programming on its DT2 subchannel. After several months, this subchannel was dropped. On September 26, 2011, WBDT began airing Bounce TV on DT2, becoming a charter affiliate of the network. On November 30, 2015, WBDT added a third subchannel to carry Ion Television (the network was also added by other Media General stations); the station had carried Pax, the forerunner of Ion Television, as a secondary affiliate, ending in 2004. On February 1, 2018, Ion Television was moved to sister station WDTN's DT3 subchannel, replacing the Justice Network; WBDT's third subchannel was dropped.

=== Spectrum reallocation ===
On April 14, 2017, it was reported that WBDT's over-the-air spectrum had been sold in the FCC's spectrum reallocation auction, fetching $27.3 million, with the FCC listing the station as set to go off the air. However, Joe Abouzeid, president and general manager of the station, characterized the auction as an "engineering exercise" and stated that the station would not go off the air or move to a new channel.

In spite of the station manager's earlier denial, WBDT began sharing sister station WDTN's digital channel on June 29, 2018.

== See also ==
- Channel 26 virtual TV stations in the United States
- Channel 31 digital TV stations in the United States
- List of television stations in Ohio
- List of television stations in Ohio (by channel number)
- List of television stations in the United States by call sign (initial letter W)
