= Vaughan Media =

American television broadcasting company

Vaughan Media, LLC
- Company type: Private
- Industry: Broadcasting
- Founded: 2011
- Headquarters: Port Charlotte, Florida, U.S.
- Key people: Thomas J. Vaughan
- Revenue: $94,000

Vaughan Media, LLC is a company that owns the broadcast licenses of several stations operated by Nexstar Media Group.

== History ==
The company was founded in 2011 when it made its first acquisition, WBDT, from ACME Communications. LIN Media, the owner of WDTN, could not legally own both WDTN and WBDT. It sold off certain assets, including WBDT's broadcast license, to Vaughan Media. The sale was consummated on May 20, 2011, at which point LIN took control of the station via a shared services agreement with WDTN.

In 2012, the company acquired television stations owned by PBC Broadcasting which were operated by New Vision Television.

In August 2014, it was announced that Sinclair Broadcast Group would take over the shared services agreement to operate WTGS as well as rights to acquire the station. Sinclair exercised the option and acquired the station upon close of the sale of LIN Media to Media General.

The remaining Vaughan stations continued under operation by Media General after the LIN sale. On January 17, 2017, Nexstar Media Group closed its acquisition of Media General and took over operation of the Vaughan stations.

== Stations ==
=== Current ===
City of license / Market	Station	Channel TV (RF)	Owned since	Network affiliation
Topeka, Kansas	KTKA-TV	49 (16)	2012	ABC; The CW Plus (DT3)
Dayton - Springfield, Ohio	WBDT	26 (31)	2011	The CW
Youngstown, Ohio	WYTV	33 (31)	2012	ABC; MyNetworkTV (DT2)
Austin, Texas	KNVA	54 (23)	2012	The CW

=== Former Vaughan stations ===
City of License / Market	Station	Channel TV (RF)	Years owned	Current status
Hardeeville, South Carolina - Savannah, Georgia	WTGS	28 (28)	2012–2014	Fox affiliate owned by Sinclair Broadcast Group
