= WCET (TV) =

Television station in Cincinnati

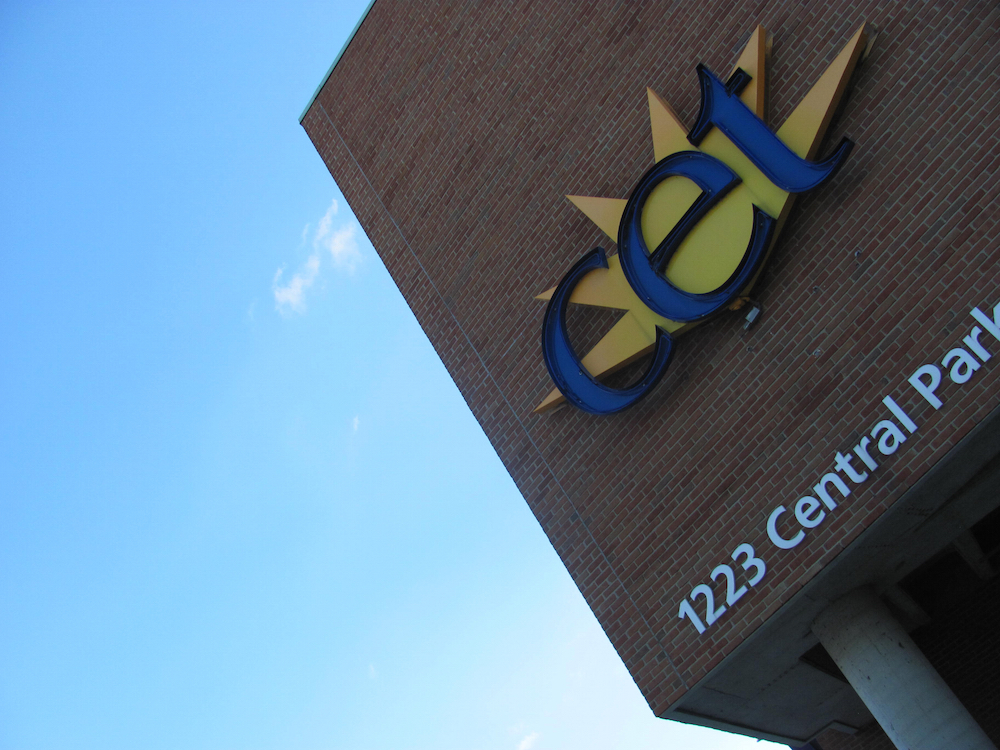
- WCET headquarters on Central Parkway in downtown Cincinnati
- Cincinnati, Ohio; United States
- Channels: Digital: 17 (UHF); Virtual: 48
- Branding: CET

Programming
- Affiliations: 48.1: PBS; 48.2: Create; 48.3: CET Arts

Ownership
- Owner: Public Media Connect; (The Greater Cincinnati Television Educational Foundation)
- Sister stations: WPTD, WPTO (Think TV)

History
- First air date: July 26, 1954
- Former channel numbers: Analog: 48 (UHF, 1954–2009); Digital: 34 (UHF, 2002–2019)
- Former affiliations: NET (1954–1970)
- Call sign meaning: "Cincinnati Educational Television"

Technical information
- Licensing authority: FCC
- Facility ID: 65666
- ERP: 274 kW
- HAAT: 325 m (1,066 ft)
- Transmitter coordinates: 39°7′27″N 84°31′18″W

Links
- Public license information: Public file; LMS
- Website: www.cetconnect.org

WCET (channel 48) is a PBS member television station in Cincinnati, Ohio, United States. The station is owned by the Greater Cincinnati Television Educational Foundation, a subsidiary of Public Media Connect. WCET was the first licensed public television station in the United States. Its studios are located at the Crosley Telecommunications Center on Central Parkway in downtown Cincinnati, and its transmitter is located on Chickasaw Street in the CUF section of Cincinnati. Master control operations are based at the studios of sister PBS member station WPTD (channel 16) at the ThinkTV TeleCenter on South Jefferson Street in downtown Dayton.

== History ==
The Federal Communications Commission (FCC) assigned channel 48 to WCET in 1951. A corporate charter and construction permit were granted in 1953. WCET began broadcasting on July 26, 1954, from a converted closet on the third floor of Music Hall. The first day of programming began with Tel-A-Story, a half-hour reading program by the Cincinnati library. On March 11, 1955, the FCC granted WCET the first non-commercial educational broadcast license in the country. WCET remained at Music Hall until 1959, when it moved to the former WLWT studios on Chickasaw Street.

WCET logo, ca. 1994.

Originally, WCET was funded through local school levies. However, a failed levy in 1966 forced the station to seek other sources of funding. In 1968, WCET held its inaugural Action Auction, raising $31,000 in two days.

In 1976, the station moved to its present studio location at the Crosley Telecommunications Center, which it now shares with the market's two main public radio stations, WVXU-FM and WGUC-FM.

In 1981, Warner Cable agreed to carry four additional channels of instructional programming provided by WCET.

In the late 1990s, like PBS-member stations in many larger television markets, WCET partnered with the for-profit company Lakeshore Learning Materials to operate a retail store. WCET took a 25% share in the Channel 48 Store of Knowledge, proceeds from which went towards the station's endowment fund. The 5,300-square-foot (490 m^{2}) store sold merchandise related to PBS shows at the Kenwood Towne Centre from November 23, 1996, until the chain's bankruptcy and liquidation in 2001. The Discovery Channel Store, a similarly themed retail outlet, opened in its place the following September.

Once simply branded "Channel 48" and later as "WCET48", the station simplified its name to "CET" on September 16, 2003, moving away from its call sign and channel number, in part to indicate its increasing focus on online services. It began an IP-based on-demand video service via its website, CETconnect.

On May 8, 2009, the Greater Cincinnati Television Educational Foundation and Greater Dayton Public Television (licensee of that market's PBS station WPTD) formed the umbrella non-profit organization Public Media Connect. Both WCET and WPTD operate as subsidiaries of PMC, with separate branding and fundraising efforts. The merger resulted in the July 2010 transfer of WCET's master control operations to WPTD's facilities in Dayton, in an attempt to reduce costs for WCET.

WCET and the Think^{TV} channels were off the air (and not available through any other providers) from just after 4 p.m. on July 5 until 11:40 a.m. on July 9, 2019, due to the failure of a multiplexer in the master control power supply at Think^{TV} in downtown Dayton.

== Original programming ==
The following television series were previously or are currently produced by WCET:

- Action Auction – televised station fundraiser
- Congressional Outlook – national public affairs program hosted by Patrick Tyler; joint venture with Congressional Quarterly
- Focus 48 – local public affairs program
- It's Academic (1960s–1980s) – local version, in partnership with WLWT
- Lilias, Yoga and You (1972–1999)
- Showcase with Barbara Kellar – local arts and cultural series airing on CET Arts

Most original WCET footage prior to 1990 was not archived and has been lost.

== Notable people ==
- John Knoepfle – producer and director; later a poet, translator, and educator

== Technical information ==
=== Subchannels ===
The station's signal is multiplexed:

Subchannels of WCET
| Subchannel | Res. | Short name | Programming |
|---|---|---|---|
| 48.1 | 1080i | CETHD | PBS |
| 48.2 | 480i | Create | CET Create |
| 48.3 | 480i | Art | CET Arts |
| 54.1 | 720p | KET | KET / PBS (WCVN-TV) |
| 54.3 | 480i | KETKY | Kentucky Channel (WCVN-TV) |

Broadcast on behalf of another station

CET Create and CET Arts are also available on the digital cable tiers of local cable provider Charter Spectrum. "CETWorld", affiliated with PBS World (now branded simply as World), was carried on channel 48.2 from 2003 to January 5, 2009, and on 48.3 from September 24 of that year to February 1, 2010. During this time, it was also carried by Spectrum's predecessor, Time Warner Cable. World programming continues to be carried on Think^{TV} World, a subchannel of sister station WPTO.

On February 1, 2010, CETWorld was replaced with CET Arts on digital subchannel 48.3. CET Arts showcases drama, visual arts, dance and music programming ranging from symphonic to bluegrass.

On March 4, 2012, at 6:49 pm, CET aired its first live high definition pledge break from its studio, around the concert program Under the Streetlamp.

=== Analog-to-digital conversion ===
WCET signed on its digital signal on UHF channel 34 on December 4, 2002; it began broadcasting in high definition 24 hours a day on October 1, 2005. The station ended regular programming on its analog signal, over UHF channel 48, at 12:01 a.m. after a brief playing of the original sign-off tape on May 1, 2009. The station's digital signal remained on its pre-transition UHF channel 34, using virtual channel 48.

== See also ==
- Cincinnati Public Radio Inc.
