= WPTD =

Television station in Dayton, Ohio

- Dayton, Ohio; United States
- Channels: Digital: 35 (UHF); Virtual: 16
- Branding: ThinkTV 16

Programming
- Affiliations: 16.1: PBS; for others, see § Subchannels

Ownership
- Owner: Public Media Connect; (Greater Dayton Public Television, Inc.)
- Sister stations: WPTO; WCET

History
- First air date: March 20, 1967 (Note: As WKTR-TV in Kettering. With some exceptions, the station was off the air from February 27, 1971, until April 24, 1972, when it returned to the air as educational station WOET-TV.)
- Former call signs: WKTR-TV (1967–1971); WOET-TV (1972–1977)
- Former channel numbers: Analog: 16 (UHF, 1972–2009); Digital: 58 (UHF, 2003–2009), 16 (UHF, 2009–2019)
- Former affiliations: Independent (1967–1969, August 1970–1971); ABC (January–August 1970)
- Call sign meaning: Public Television in Dayton

Technical information
- Licensing authority: FCC
- Facility ID: 25067
- ERP: 250 kW
- HAAT: 345 m (1,132 ft)
- Transmitter coordinates: 39°43′16″N 84°15′0″W
- Translator(s): W25FI-D Maplewood

Links
- Public license information: Public file; LMS
- Website: thinktv.org

WPTD (channel 16) is a PBS member television station in Dayton, Ohio, United States, serving the Miami Valley. The station broadcasts from studios at the ThinkTV TeleCenter on South Jefferson Street in downtown Dayton and a transmitter near South Gettysburg Avenue in the Highview Hills neighborhood in southwest Dayton. Its signal is relayed by translator station W25FI-D in Maplewood, Ohio, which broadcasts to Celina, Lima, and Wapakoneta.

WPTD and WPTO (channel 14), licensed to Oxford but primarily broadcasting to greater Cincinnati and providing secondary public TV service in the Dayton and Cincinnati areas, form ThinkTV (stylized as Think^{TV}). ThinkTV, legally Greater Dayton Public Television, and WCET in Cincinnati are separate subsidiaries of Public Media Connect; master control for all three stations is located in Dayton.

Channel 16 in Dayton was originally allocated for educational use, but this changed in 1965. A commercial station—WKTR-TV, owned by Kittyhawk Television and licensed to nearby Kettering—was built on channel 16 in 1967. It operated as a money-losing independent station for nearly all of its four-year history, with one major exception. On January 1, 1970, in a surprise, WKTR was announced as the new ABC affiliate for Dayton. This was vigorously contested by WKEF (channel 22), which had been airing most of ABC's programming in the market and was widely expected to become the full-time affiliate. Less than two months later, it was revealed that Kittyhawk management had bribed an ABC official in exchange for affiliation with the network, a scandal that led to a conviction, the resignations of two other network employees, and a federal investigation into bribery at the major networks. ABC also moved to revoke the affiliation agreement with WKTR-TV effective that August. In May, a federal judge overseeing a lawsuit filed by WKEF ordered ABC to supply its prime time programming to that station; WKTR-TV aired ABC's daytime shows until August 31, 1970, when all ABC programming moved to WKEF. Facing a challenge to its broadcast license and a petition by television program distributors to force it into involuntary bankruptcy, Kittyhawk took WKTR-TV off the air beginning February 27, 1971.

Plans already existed at that time to activate an educational television station in Dayton. The Ohio Educational Television Network Commission, a state agency coordinating educational broadcasting activities, used funds initially intended for new station construction to acquire the WKTR-TV license and transmitter; channel 16 began broadcasting again on April 24, 1972, as WOET-TV. WOET-TV initially served to simulcast WMUB-TV (the now-WPTO) in Oxford. In 1975, the commission transferred the license to University Regional Broadcasting—a consortium of Miami University, Central State University, and Wright State University. The station changed its call letters to WPTD in 1977; University Regional Broadcasting renamed itself Greater Dayton Public Television in 1982. After previously having offices spread in multiple locations, the station consolidated into new downtown Dayton studios in 1988. WPTO became a separately programmed secondary station in 1992.

== WKTR-TV ==
=== Construction and early years ===
Ultra high frequency (UHF) channel 16 was the originally allocated reserved channel for educational television in Dayton. However, early exploration of activating the channel proved fruitless. In September 1953, a study group ceased activities, stating that starting such a station was "beyond the ability of this area". Interest increased in 1961 when the Miami Valley Educational Television Foundation was formed.

However, in 1965, the Federal Communications Commission (FCC) reallocated UHF television channels nationwide. The educational reservation was shifted to channel 45, and channel 16 became available for use by a commercial station. That June, Kittyhawk Broadcasting Corporation announced it would file to build channel 16 as an independent station and the fourth commercial outlet in the region; the station would be located in nearby Kettering. The FCC approved Kittyhawk's application and granted a construction permit at the start of December. Kittyhawk announced it would build studios on a property on Stroop Road, previously occupied by the local YMCA in Kettering and a transmitter at Moraine. However, work was delayed while Kittyhawk petitioned the FCC for a taller tower than originally proposed; a start date of January 1968 was set.

Delayed by weather and supply issues, WKTR-TV went on the air on March 20, 1967. Eight hours of programming a day were planned, including locally produced news, educational programs for the Kettering area, and a country and western music program, though the lineup was dominated by syndicated shows and movies. At the time of launch, the company announced its reorganization as Kittyhawk Television and claimed that it could be profitable in six months. Citing strong advertising sales, WKTR moved in September to extend its broadcast day from 8 to 15 hours a day, including shows pre-empted by local network affiliates. However, this was cut back in December, when original general manager Kenneth Caywood quit and the station began broadcasting at 5 p.m. on weekdays with a schedule featuring mainly movies.

=== ABC sale negotiations ===
WKTR-TV continued to operate at a loss in 1968, and in January, negotiations were held with the ABC television network over a possible sale of channel 16, with ABC employees visiting Kettering to examine the station. It would have been the first UHF television station owned by ABC; the network already owned the maximum of five stations on the very high frequency (VHF) band and could own up to two UHF stations such as WKTR-TV. John Campbell, president of the owned-and-operated stations division of ABC, admitted on January 31 that the network was interested in the station. The possibility of WKTR-TV affiliating with ABC posed the possibility of major changes in local television. Even though Dayton had three stations, ABC programs were split between WLWD (channel 2) and WKEF (channel 22), with the latter seeking a full affiliation and not getting it. WKEF aired 70 percent of the network's output in the Dayton area.

On February 13, 1969, ABC's board of directors authorized Campbell to proceed with buying WKTR-TV for $1.85 million subject to FCC approval. However, WKEF—which stood to lose all the ABC programs it carried—and parent company Springfield Television announced they would fight to block the transaction. WKEF general manager George Mitchell expressed dismay that ABC was capitalizing on the "spade work" WKEF had done in establishing UHF broadcasting in Dayton, while Campbell noted that ABC could cancel its secondary affiliation agreement with WKEF on four days' notice and that its WLWD affiliation expired in January 1970. Not wanting to endure a legal fight they predicted could last two to four years, Kittyhawk and ABC terminated the sale agreement in March.

=== Affiliation with ABC and bribery scandal ===
Even though it opted not to buy channel 16, ABC still needed an affiliate in Dayton for 1970, when WLWD would become a full-time NBC affiliate. WKEF was predicted to have the inside track on the affiliation. However, in a surprise on November 21, 1969, ABC announced that WKTR-TV would become the new primary ABC affiliate for Dayton. In a statement, Kittyhawk president John A. Kemper hailed the announcement as the "happiest day of our lives" and attributed ABC's selection to its color programming and facilities; the vice president of the company noted that its investors had endured a deficit of nearly $2 million. This announcement also met with legal action from WKEF. In mid-December, it sued ABC, Kittyhawk, and Kemper. In its suit, the station alleged that ABC had invited it in May 1969 to sign an affiliation agreement, though it could not do so until November, and that it had been the primary carrier of ABC network programs in the Dayton area since March 1968. It fretted that, should the affiliation not be blocked in the courts, ABC would eventually move to buy the station outright. The lawsuit also alleged that William L. Putnam and ABC were at odds over plans to add VHF "drop-in" channels in markets throughout the U.S., an action opposed by Putnam but supported by ABC, and that Putnam had thwarted ABC plans in the northeast by dropping ABC from WWLP in Springfield, Massachusetts, and preventing the ABC affiliate in New Haven, Connecticut—WTNH—from moving its transmitter closer to Springfield. It also revealed that Kittyhawk had allegedly been rebuffed in its efforts to buy WKEF before filing for and building channel 16. The affiliation switch went ahead on January 1 as planned after WKEF's request for a temporary injunction was denied by a federal judge on the grounds that blocking the affiliation could cause WKTR-TV to lose its financing and its assets to creditors.

The affiliation fight took a new and sudden turn when Thomas G. Sullivan, a 43-year-old regional manager for ABC, was fired by the network on February 19. ABC vice president Robert Kaufman then filed a criminal complaint against Sullivan. Kaufman charged that Sullivan had told Kemper that WKTR-TV would need to pay $50,000 to a consultant by the name of John L. P. Daley Jr., which in actuality was a bribe. A lawyer for Kemper denied the allegations.

In light of the bribery case on February 26, ABC gave WKTR-TV a required six months' notice that it was ending its affiliation contract with the station effective August 30. It invited WKTR-TV and WKEF to submit new presentations outlining their cases for affiliation with the network. This marked part of a blitz of cleaning house orchestrated by network vice president James Hagerty, who had been the presidential press secretary in the 1950s. Hagerty told newsmen of the telegram that was sent to WKTR-TV and WKEF and fielded inquiries from reporters. The same day, Kemper resigned from Kittyhawk Television.

ABC hereby revokes its invitation of Mar. 12, 1970, to you to make presentation for a new affiliation agreement in light of evidence developed during the pre-trial discovery proceedings in the Dayton litigation, the statement read into the record of that proceeding by your counsel on Apr. 9, 1970, and the investigation for ABC by Mr. Clarence Fried.

— ABC telegram to WKTR-TV on April 11, 1970

With the addition of WSWO-TV (channel 26) in Springfield, all three Dayton-area UHF stations were invited to submit proposals for ABC affiliation to the network. Meanwhile, later in March, WKEF renewed its efforts in court to obtain an injunction barring ABC from supplying its programs to WKTR. This new lawsuit added two names to the case: Carmine Patti, ABC director of station relations, and Theodore H. Shaker, ABC vice president for the owned-and-operated stations. WKEF alleged that Kemper had met Joseph McMahon, who knew many ABC officials including Patti, at a party in Fort Lauderdale, Florida; he then hired McMahon as WKTR's representative in New York to lobby ABC for the affiliation. When Bert Julian, another ABC regional representative whose territory then included Dayton, was found to favor WKEF, it was alleged that Kemper complained to McMahon, who in turn told Patti; shortly thereafter, Dayton was moved from Julian's purview to Sullivan's, and Sullivan then suggested the hiring of the fictitious "John L. P. Daley". On April 11, days before Kittyhawk officials were to visit New York City to present to the network, ABC notified WKTR by telegram that it was revoking its invitation to the station to present an affiliation proposal to continue with the network after August 30—leaving WKEF and WSWO-TV as the only bidders—after additional evidence was uncovered in the WKEF court case and in a private investigation conducted on ABC's behalf.

On May 1, 1970, federal judge Timothy Sylvester Hogan issued an injunction ordering ABC to return to the pre-1970 status quo in Dayton within 20 days, requiring the network to move most shows off WKTR-TV and back to WKEF while the suit continued; however, WKTR-TV retained some ABC programs that WLWD had been carrying prior to 1970. An agreement was reached that saw ABC programming split between the two stations; channel 16 would air daytime ABC shows, while the ABC Evening News and prime time programs would air on channel 22. A revised court order then gave WKEF rights to the ABC prime time programming beginning at the end of May. ABC then awarded WKEF the full-time ABC affiliation in June, giving it first call rights to all network programs for the first time in its history.

=== Financial troubles and shutdown ===
In WKTR-TV's final months with ABC programming, financial issues returned. Montgomery County sued Kittyhawk Television seeking payment on $9,000 in unpaid taxes; eight employees were laid off; and a sale was announced to an unspecified group of "veteran broadcasters located in the West", though this never materialized. At the start of September, ahead of the scheduled expiration of the station's broadcast license, Springfield Television challenged Kittyhawk Television's renewal, citing the facts raised in the bribery case. Another creditor, a Virginia advertising firm, sued to force the appointment of a receiver for Kittyhawk; four months later, three television program syndicators filed a petition seeking the placement of the business into involuntary bankruptcy.

On February 27, 1971, WKTR-TV failed to sign on the air. An employee told the Dayton Daily News that the board of directors had decided to cease telecasting.

== Public TV for Dayton ==
=== WOET-TV: An educational rescue ===
The Ohio Educational Television Network Commission (OET), a state government agency tasked with building and expanding a network of educational television stations across the state, entered into negotiations to purchase channel 16 from Kittyhawk Television. This marked an acceleration for plans already in the works to build an educational station on channel 45, which had been the allocation since the 1965 national allotment changes. The Ohio Board of Regents had already set aside $565,000 for a Dayton station, with programming to be managed by a consortium of Miami University, Central State University, and Wright State University. In addition, Springfield Television asked the FCC to hold off on acting on its petition to deny the license renewal, citing the negotiations to sell channel 16 for educational use. Negotiations were finalized in April for a $550,000 purchase of WKTR-TV, though only the license and transmitter were included. Meanwhile, in the bankruptcy case, Kittyhawk denied it was bankrupt, and Thomas G. Sullivan was sentenced to five years' probation for accepting the WKTR-TV bribe. Late on the evening of April 27, WKTR-TV broadcast for the first time in two months after its two-month authorization to remain off the air was believed to have ended. In fact, the FCC had granted an extension, but this was not received in time, and the station broadcast anyway.

The return of channel 16 to the air was planned for September to coincide with the start of fall programming on Miami University's WMUB-TV (channel 14) in Oxford, but the FCC had yet to approve the license transfer due to the pending bankruptcy case. This meant that Sesame Street went unseen in Dayton for a brief time, as WKEF had been airing the show and dropped it in anticipation of WKTR returning. The FCC did not approve the transfer until October 15, but it was not until 1972 that the station returned to the air. During that time, the call letters were changed to WOET-TV, for Ohio Educational Television, and the universities agreed to pay for nighttime programming on the station after funding was cut by the Ohio General Assembly.

WOET-TV began broadcasting as an educational television station on April 24, 1972, by rebroadcasting WMUB-TV. WMUB-TV then rebroadcast PBS programs from WCET in Cincinnati. Even though WOET-TV was now broadcasting, Miami, Central State, and Wright State continued to quarrel over the shape of their partnership to run channel 16. The Network Commission intended to transfer the license to the consortium, but Wright State objected to the inclusion of Miami, which the network commission had insisted on because of its existing studios and previous television experience. Wright State believed it should be the sole operator of the station, though it ultimately relented and agreed to the tri-university consortium.

=== Maturation ===
Plans for the consortium, to be known as University Regional Broadcasting (URB), took a step forward in 1974, when WMUB-TV was added to the proposed design of the group; eventually, separate programming for the two stations was foreseen. On April 22, 1975, the FCC approved the transfer of the WOET-TV license from the Network Commission to University Regional Broadcasting, with the tri-university consortium taking over on July 1.

The shift to University Regional Broadcasting coincided with the maturation of channel 16. WOET-TV held its first fundraising drive in March 1975 as part of a PBS national initiative. Operations moved to a facility on Dixie Drive,and translators were built at Celina and Piqua to extend coverage. The station changed its call letters to WPTD (Public Television in Dayton) on March 1, 1977 (with WMUB-TV becoming WPTO, Public Television in Oxford). On May 30, 1980, the FCC approved the change of WPTD's city of license from Kettering to Dayton. University Regional Broadcasting renamed itself Greater Dayton Public Television in 1982, reflecting its status as a community licensee without active university management.

=== Into new studios ===
Dr. Clair R. Tettemer, the only president of WPTD–WPTO throughout the 10-year history of University Regional Broadcasting/Greater Dayton Public Television, retired in 1985 and was replaced by Jerrold Wareham, a native of Norfolk, Virginia, who had been president of WHRO-TV in that city. Wareham's largest challenge was consolidating the public TV station's studios and offices: an operations center in Jefferson Township and offices in Kettering, plus a site in Moraine from which the station's annual auction—a major fundraiser—originated. The lack of studio space presented a major constraint on local programming; the only available studio at the Jefferson Township site had once been a transmitter room. Prior to Wareham's arrival, Greater Dayton Public Television had begun a capital campaign. While the station was invited to move into a new performing arts center in Dayton, it could not wait for the project to develop. In March 1987, WPTD signed an agreement to relocate to 22,000 square feet (2,000 m^{2}) of space in the Transportation Center downtown, aided by a construction loan from the city of Dayton. Soundproofing tests were required because the facility was near the Greyhound Lines bus depot; the facility's design, with a relative lack of windows, led Dayton city officials to adopt new standards for future downtown building projects. The new facility opened in 1988.

The new studios also helped lay the groundwork for providing separate programming from WPTD and WPTO. Over a year, between late 1986 and late 1987, the two stations split for fewer than 10 programs. However, it was not until transmitter improvements at both Dayton and Oxford created services with signal overlap that this vision was deemed feasible. This eventually came to pass on July 1, 1992, when WPTO began airing a secondary lineup of primarily instructional and educational programs as well as documentaries and rebroadcasts of key PBS shows in different time periods. WPTO was added to the major cable systems in Cincinnati and Dayton in 1993.

Wareham left Greater Dayton Public Television in 1993 to become the president of WVIZ, the public television station in Cleveland. He was replaced by David M. Fogarty, who had previously served under Wareham as station manager.

=== ThinkTV: Collaboration and merger with WCET ===
The name ThinkTV was adopted for WPTD and WPTO in 1998. The rebrand won a national award from PBS.

In 2000, ThinkTV and WCET began sharing a senior executive, Scott Elliott, who had previously only worked at WCET. While the employee-sharing did not represent a merger, it paved the way for further collaboration between the public broadcasters, who had talked four times in 25 years about merging. On October 31, 2008, Greater Dayton Public Television and the Greater Cincinnati Television Educational Foundation (CET), owner of WCET, announced plans to merge their resources into one non-profit organization serving all of Southwest Ohio while maintaining separate identities. In May 2009, after two years of discussions, Public Media Connect was formed as a merger of the two groups, with each continuing as local nonprofits and subsidiaries. The merger resulted in the July 2010 transfer of WCET's master control operations to ThinkTV's facilities in Dayton.

Fogarty retired as president of Public Media Connect in June 2020. That year also saw WCET and ThinkTV combine their previously separate annual auction fundraisers, Action Auction and Great TV Auction, into a single event, the CET/ThinkTV Action Auction.

== Technical information ==
=== Subchannels ===
WPTD's digital signal is multiplexed. It includes a subchannel of WRGT-TV as part of Dayton's ATSC 3.0 (NextGen TV) hosting arrangement:

Subchannels of WPTD
Subchannel	Res.	Short name	Programming
16.1	1080i	WPTD-HD	PBS
16.2	480i	Journey	ThinkTV 16 Journey
16.3	480i	World	World Channel
16.4	480i	Ohio	The Ohio Channel
16.5	480i	Kids	PBS Kids
45.5	480i	TCN	True Crime Network (WRGT-TV)

Broadcast on behalf of another station

In 2003, WPTD broadcast four additional channels, one in high definition, in addition to a simulcast of its main service. The station's subchannels from 2003 to 2009 were 16.2: a simulcast of analog channel 16; 16.3: "Again", repeats of channel 16's prime time programming; 16.4: Create; 16.5: The Ohio Channel; and 16.6: distinct high-definition programming from PBS, simulcast on WPTO 14.6.

After analog broadcasting ceased on May 1, 2009, WPTD realigned its subchannels: 16.1 began carrying former analog channel 16's PBS programming in high definition and widescreen; "Again" moved to 16.2; Create moved to 16.3; The Ohio Channel moved to 16.4; 16.5 became a standard-definition simulcast of 16.1; and 16.6 was dropped. Later in 2009, WPTD replaced Create on 16.3 with "Life": locally programmed, but carrying a similar mix of lifestyle and how-to programming (including arts and crafts, cooking, health and fitness, home and garden, and travel shows) as Create.

On January 16, 2017, 16.5 was changed to PBS Kids. In September 2017, 16.4 was rebranded from "Ohio" to "Ohio/World", with programming added from the World Channel.

After a December 2025 announcement, ThinkTV rebranded several of WPTD's subchannels effective January 5, 2026: 16.2 was rebranded as "Journey", continuing some prime time repeats and adding lifestyle programs previously carried on "Life", and international news. 16.3 was rebranded as "World" and now carries the World Channel 24/7. 16.4 was rebranded as "Ohio", dropping World Channel programming and continuing to carry The Ohio Channel, now 24/7. Similar changes were also made to ThinkTV sister station, WPTO.

=== Over-the-air broadcasting ===
WPTD's transmitter is located near South Gettysburg Avenue in the Highview Hills neighborhood in southwest Dayton.

The station began digital telecasting on May 1, 2003; WPTO followed suit on June 28, 2004. ThinkTV ceased analog broadcasting from Dayton and Oxford on May 1, 2009, earlier than the June 12 national transition deadline. The WPTD digital signal moved from channel 58, which was among the high band UHF channels (52–69) that were removed from broadcasting use as a result of the transition, to channel 16 at that time. WPTD then moved to channel 35 on October 18, 2019, as part of the FCC's spectrum reallocation process.

In July 2019, ThinkTV and WCET lost all service for nearly four days due to the failure of a multiplexer in the master control power supply at ThinkTV in downtown Dayton. That November, WPTD temporarily broadcast the main channel of WHIO-TV (channel 7) for three days after WHIO-TV suffered a transmitter failure.

=== Translators ===
W25FI-D, in its present configuration, replaces the former Celina and Maplewood analog translators.

On September 19, 1977, translators for WPTD were activated at Celina (channel 17, W17AA) and Maplewood (channel 63, W63AH). The signal from WPTD was received at Maplewood, rebroadcast, and sent on to Celina. This filled in a gap in public television coverage between WPTD, WBGU-TV, and WOSU-TV, though in later years some of the area served received an upgraded signal from WPTD itself.

Both transmitter sites were on towers owned by the state of Ohio, which began planning a next-generation tower system in the late 2000s and intended to demolish the Maplewood site if ownership was not transitioned to Shelby County. The county then sold the site at auction. On March 30, 2010, W63AH lost its ability to use the tower at Maplewood and was taken off the air; on January 5, 2011, the state of Ohio shut off power to the Celina translator in anticipation of dismantling the tower. The Maplewood translator was then moved to another tower near Celina, where it began service in January 2011 as W32DS-D. From this location, the translator covered Celina. Due to interference that would be caused to a repacked WANE-TV in Fort Wayne, Indiana, the translator moved to channel 25 as W25FI-D in January 2020.
