= WRGT-TV =

Television station in Dayton, Ohio

ATSC 3.0 station
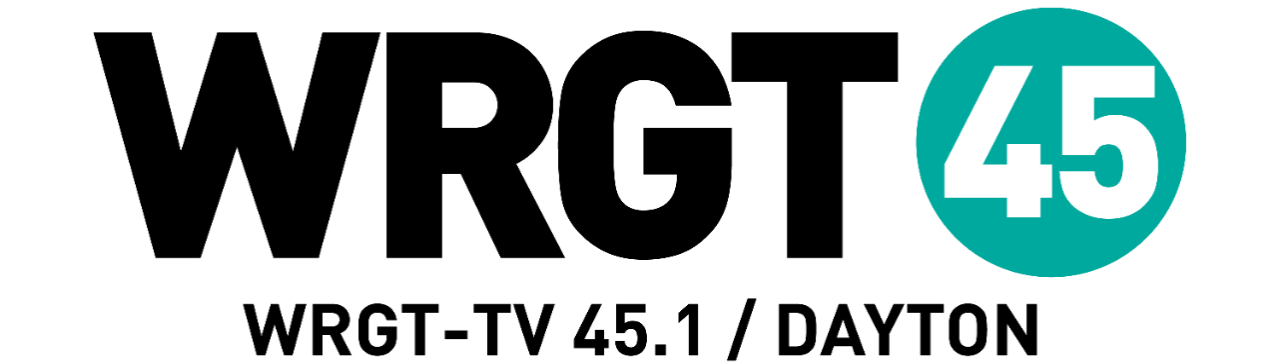
- Dayton, Ohio; United States
- Channels: Digital: 36 (UHF); Virtual: 45
- Branding: WRGT 45

Programming
- Affiliations: 45.1: Roar; for others, see § Subchannels

Ownership
- Owner: Cunningham Broadcasting; (WRGT Licensee, LLC)
- Operator: Sinclair Broadcast Group via LMA
- Sister stations: WKEF

History
- First air date: September 23, 1984
- Former channel numbers: Analog: 45 (UHF, 1984–2009); Digital: 30 (UHF, 2002–2019)
- Former affiliations: Independent (1984–1986); Fox (1986–January 2021); MyNetworkTV (January–March 2021); Dabl (March 2021–2025)
- Call sign meaning: In tribute of the Dayton-native Wright brothers

Technical information
- Licensing authority: FCC
- Facility ID: 411
- ERP: 1,000 kW
- HAAT: 351 m (1,152 ft)
- Transmitter coordinates: 39°43′28.6″N 84°15′17.6″W

Links
- Public license information: Public file; LMS

WRGT-TV (channel 45) is a television station in Dayton, Ohio, United States, airing programming from the digital multicast network Roar. It is owned by Cunningham Broadcasting, which maintains a local marketing agreement (LMA) with Sinclair Broadcast Group, owner of ABC/Fox/MyNetworkTV affiliate WKEF (channel 22), for the provision of certain services. However, Sinclair effectively owns WRGT-TV as the majority of Cunningham's stock is owned by the family of deceased group founder Julian Smith. The two stations share studios on Corporate Place in Miamisburg; WRGT-TV's transmitter is located off South Gettysburg Avenue in southwest Dayton.

WRGT-TV was a charter Fox affiliate from the network's sign-on in 1986 until 2021.

== History ==
WRGT-TV signed on as an independent station on September 23, 1984, owned by Meridian Communications, based in Pittsburgh. WRGT-TV was Meridian's second station; it had launched WVAH-TV in Charleston, West Virginia, two years earlier. Meridian founded WRGT-TV following a high-stakes "in-contest" competition among four potential owners in the late 1970s. The station ran a general-entertainment format consisting of cartoons, classic sitcoms, recent off-network sitcoms, old movies, drama shows, and sports. On its sign on date, WRGT-TV broadcast 2001: A Space Odyssey, with a stereo simulcast of the audio over WTUE-FM 104.7. It originally used the slogan "Off To a Flying Start", featuring an animated Wright "B" Flyer used in its first promos (the "WRGT" calls are a reference to the Wright brothers).

Prior to its sign on, the only source of non-network programming in Dayton was WTJC (channel 26, now WBDT) a mostly religious station. However, WXIX-TV and WIII-TV (now WSTR-TV), both in Cincinnati, and WTTE in Columbus all reached portions of the Dayton market, and WTTV in Indianapolis was available on cable. Meridian persuaded WTJC's owner, Miami Valley Christian Television, to sell most of that station's non-religious programming to WRGT-TV. For all intents and purposes, it was now the only general-entertainment station in Dayton and the first independent since the demise of WKTR-TV in 1970 (now public station WPTD) and WSWO-TV in Springfield in 1972 (which used the same channel 26 allocation as WTJC/WBDT).

Despite the competition from larger-market stations and with WXIX, WSTR and WTTV being available on cable, WRGT-TV prospered. It would not have any real competition in Dayton until 1999 when WBDT became a primary WB affiliate (it was a brief O&O of the Pax TV network before then). After Fox launched on October 6, 1986, WRGT-TV became a charter affiliate of the fledgling network. On October 30, 1987, Meridian sold the station to Act III Broadcasting. Act III merged with Abry Broadcast Partners in 1995; the group would be renamed Sullivan Broadcasting, after Dan Sullivan was named as the company's its president and CEO.

In 1998, after Sullivan was bought out by Sinclair, Sinclair filed to sell all license assets of the station, alongside WVAH-TV to Glencairn, Ltd. Around the same time, Sinclair had also bought WKEF (then an NBC affiliate). In 2001, Sinclair purchased most of Sullivan's other stations, but could not buy WRGT-TV for two reasons. The Dayton market has only seven full-power stations, not enough to legally permit a duopoly. Also, the Federal Communications Commission (FCC) does not allow common ownership of two of the four highest-rated stations in a single market. However, nearly all of Glencairn's stock was controlled by trusts in the name of the Smith family who were founding owners of Sinclair. This effectively gave Sinclair a duopoly in Dayton. Glencairn later changed its name to Cunningham Broadcasting. There is undeniable evidence that Glencairn/Cunningham are merely shell corporations used to circumvent FCC ownership rules.

Until the early 2021 move of the Fox 45 programming to a subchannel of sister station WKEF, WRGT-TV was also considered an alternate ABC affiliate, airing that network's programs when WKEF was unable to do so such as during a breaking news emergency or local special. Until that move, WRGT-TV, along with CBS affiliate WHIO-TV (channel 7), were the only two stations in the area who had not changed their network affiliations even through the swaps of 2004.

In August 2006, it was confirmed that Fox's new sister network, MyNetworkTV, would air on a new second digital subchannel of WRGT-TV. On September 16, 2006, Time Warner Cable added MyTV Dayton to its digital cable lineup. In November 2008, the subchannel additionally became a launch-day affiliate of This TV, while retaining MyNetworkTV in prime time.

Around November 11, 2010, Sinclair announced that when carriage agreements expired at the end of the year, it planned to pull all of its owned and/or operated TV stations in the United States, including WRGT-TV and WKEF, from Time Warner Cable, in a dispute over "retransmission fees". Negotiations began between the two parties. Around December 6, Time Warner announced that it would continue to provide Fox network programming on its systems (presumably via video on demand services), under a deal reached with Fox earlier in 2010; syndicated and local programs on Sinclair's Fox affiliates would not be seen. On December 31, Time Warner reached an agreement with an out-of-market station, presumably Cincinnati's WXIX-TV, to provide Fox network programming at least through the end of February. Later that same day, Sinclair and Time Warner extended talks for another two weeks, with continued cable carriage of Sinclair's stations, through January 14, 2011. On January 15, 2011, after a 24-hour extension of the previous deadline, Time Warner and Sinclair reached a tentative settlement. After further negotiations, a final agreement was reached on February 2, 2011, keeping WRGT-TV and WKEF on Time Warner.

On February 21, 2012, Miamisburg City Council approved a $150,000 loan to Sinclair, which planned to move the WRGT-TV/WKEF studios from Soldiers Home-West Carrollton Road in Dayton, and to move their business and sales offices from Broadcast Plaza (the former WRGT-TV studios), consolidating all within the former studios of CW affiliate WBDT on Corporate Place, off Byers Road, in Miamisburg. Sinclair expected to spend $5 million on renovations to its new facility, making it fully digital and high definition. The stations had anticipated moving into their new studios in November 2012; the move was finalized on January 27, 2013, with high definition newscasts, updated graphics and new logos on both stations.

On May 15, 2012, Sinclair Broadcast Group and Fox agreed to a five-year extension to the network's affiliation agreement with Sinclair's 19 Fox stations, including WRGT-TV, allowing them to continue carrying Fox programming through 2017.

On the network's October 31, 2015 launch, WRGT-TV added the Sinclair-owned Comet on its third digital subchannel, 45.3.

On February 28, 2017, WRGT-TV added the Sinclair-owned Charge! on its fourth digital subchannel, 45.4. Charge! programming is only available over-the-air and has never been provided by local cable operators.

On October 8, 2019, the station replaced This TV programming on subchannel 45.2 with programming from Dabl, while retaining MyNetworkTV in prime time.

On December 29, 2020, the station announced that on January 1, 2021, its main subchannel would be moving to 22.2 on sister station WKEF. This was the result of Sinclair renewing several Fox affiliations, including that for Dayton, but instead of stations owned by their sidecar companies, the affiliations would shift to directly owned Sinclair stations. A similar move of the Fox affiliation from Port Arthur, Texas-licensed KBTV-TV, which it operates, to a subchannel of Sinclair-owned KFDM, licensed to Beaumont, Texas occurred, as station management there explained that the Fox schedule would air on both channels in a transition period ending on February 1. In addition, TBD and Stadium would be moving from WKEF to new WRGT-TV subchannels 45.5 and 45.6. The station advised over-the-air viewers to rescan on January 1. The 22.1/45.1 simulcast ended on February 4, with Fox becoming exclusive to 22.2.

That day, WRGT-DT1's programming was replaced with the MyNetworkTV/Dabl schedule formerly on 45.2, with TBD moving to 45.5 to 45.2 and the 45.6 Stadium subchannel going dark, as it moved to 45.5. On September 20, 2021, MyNetworkTV and Stadium programming then moved from 45.1 to 22.3, with Comet shifting to 45.5, and Antenna TV shifting from 22.3 to 45.3; since then, WRGT's main channel has exclusively carried Dabl.

On August 2, 2025, the station flipped to a Roar affiliate.

== Newscasts ==
As a Fox affiliate, WRGT-TV broadcast 17 1/4 hours of locally produced newscasts each week (with 3 1/4 hours each weekday and 30 minutes each on Saturdays and Sundays).

In 1998, WRGT-TV started its nightly 10 o'clock newscast, now known as Fox 45 News at 10, using sister station WKEF's existing news team. In the February 2006 sweeps period, the station's 10 o'clock news was the fastest growing local broadcast in the Dayton market, on certain nights, sometimes winning the time slot. Until 2007, there was direct 10 o'clock news competition from WHIO-TV's Time Warner Cable-only Miami Valley Channel. There was no over-the-air competition until August 18, 2007, when NBC affiliate WDTN began to produce a nightly 10 o'clock newscast on CW affiliate WBDT; this beat WRGT-TV's show in Dayton's metered market household ratings on the 26th day of its broadcast.

On June 12, 2006, WKEF began airing a weekday morning program from 5 to 7, called ABC 22 Good Morning. On the same day, WRGT-TV began airing Fox 45 in the Morning from 7 to 9 a.m. weekdays. In August 2008, WKEF began producing a 6:30 p.m. newscast for WRGT-TV, airing on weeknights against the national news broadcasts on the "Big Three" stations.

On July 9, 2019, the station rebranded its news operation as Dayton 24/7 Now, sharing that brand with WKEF. It introduced streaming apps and a social media presence with the same name and redirected its former website, www.fox45now.com. In addition, it tweaked its graphics to a different variation used by Sinclair stations.

== Technical information ==
=== Subchannels ===
The station's ATSC 1.0 channels are carried on the multiplexed signals of other Dayton television stations:

Subchannels provided by WRGT-TV (ATSC 1.0)
Subchannel	Res.	Short name	Programming	ATSC 1.0 host
45.1	480i	ROAR	Roar	WKEF
45.2	480i	Charge!	Charge!	WKEF
45.3	480i	Antenna	Antenna TV	WHIO-TV
45.4	480i	Comet	Comet	WDTN
45.5	480i	TCN	True Crime Network	WPTD

=== Analog-to-digital conversion ===
WRGT-TV shut down its analog signal, over UHF channel 45, on June 12, 2009, the official date on which full-power television stations in the United States transitioned from analog to digital broadcasts under federal mandate. The station's digital signal remained on its pre-transition UHF channel 30, using virtual channel 45.

WRGT-TV moved its digital signal from channel 30 to channel 36 at 10 a.m. on October 18, 2019, as part of the FCC's spectrum reallocation process. The station's transmitter power was reduced from 498 kW to 44.16 kW, pending a construction permit with the FCC to increase power to 1,000 kW. New antennas for both WRGT-TV and WKEF were installed via helicopter prior to December 23, 2019, and were connected to interim auxiliary transmitters on January 24, 2020; the station predicted that the transmitter work would be completed soon after.

=== ATSC 3.0 lighthouse ===
Subchannels of WRGT-TV (ATSC 3.0)
Subchannel	Res.	Short name	Programming
2.1	1080p	WDTN	NBC (WDTN)
7.1	1080p	WHIO	CBS (WHIO-TV)
16.1	1080p	WPTD	PBS (WPTD)
22.1	720p	ABC	ABC (WKEF)
22.10	1080p	T2	T2
22.11		PBTV	Pickleballtv
22.2	720p	FOX45	Fox (WKEF)
45.1	480i	WRGT	Roar

Subchannel broadcast with digital rights management
Subchannel streamed via the Internet

== See also ==
- Channel 36 digital TV stations in the United States
- Channel 45 virtual TV stations in the United States
- List of television stations in Ohio
