= WPTO =

Television station in Oxford, Ohio

- Oxford–Cincinnati, Ohio; United States
- City: Oxford, Ohio
- Channels: Digital: 29 (UHF); Virtual: 14
- Branding: ThinkTV

Programming
- Affiliations: 14.1: PBS; for others, see § Subchannels

Ownership
- Owner: Public Media Connect; (Greater Cincinnati Television Educational Foundation)
- Sister stations: WPTD, WCET

History
- First air date: 1959 (Note: Sources list start dates of October 13, October 14, and December 3.)
- Former call signs: WMUB-TV (1959–1977)
- Former channel numbers: Analog: 14 (UHF, 1959–2009); Digital: 28 (UHF, 2004–2019)
- Former affiliations: NET (1959–1970)
- Call sign meaning: Public Television in Oxford

Technical information
- Licensing authority: FCC
- Facility ID: 25065
- ERP: 500 kW
- HAAT: 279 m (915 ft)
- Transmitter coordinates: 39°7′27″N 84°31′18″W

Links
- Public license information: Public file; LMS
- Website: thinktv.org

WPTO (channel 14) is a PBS member television station licensed to Oxford, Ohio, United States. It is owned by Public Media Connect alongside WCET (channel 48, CET) in Cincinnati and WPTD (channel 16, ThinkTV) in Dayton and is managed from studios at the ThinkTV TeleCenter on South Jefferson Street in downtown Dayton. The transmitter is co-located with Cincinnati's WXIX-TV in the CUF neighborhood near the Western Hills Viaduct. WPTO serves as a secondary PBS station for the Cincinnati and Dayton areas.

Channel 14 in Oxford began broadcasting in 1959 as WMUB-TV, the educational television service of Miami University. It primarily served the immediate Oxford area, though a rebroadcaster was added to provide service to Dayton schools in 1969. In 1972, when the Ohio Educational Television Network Commission spearheaded the conversion of Dayton's channel 16 to educational programming as WOET-TV, the two stations began simulcasting. Miami University contributed WMUB-TV to the consortium known as University Regional Broadcasting (later renamed Greater Dayton Public Television), which operated channels 14 and 16, in 1975; the two stations became WPTO and WPTD in 1978.

After simulcasting with WPTD for 20 years, Greater Dayton Public Television began providing separate programming on WPTO on July 1, 1992; the new program lineup consisted of instructional and international programming. The station was added the next year to cable systems in Dayton and Cincinnati. WPTO began digital broadcasting in 2004 from a site in Cincinnati. WPTO also provides transmission capacity for two channels of Kentucky Educational Television transmitter WCVN-TV as part of a reciprocal ATSC 3.0 (NextGen TV) hosting arrangement.

== History ==
Miami University in Oxford had been telecasting educational programming within the campus using a closed-circuit system since 1956. WMUB-TV began broadcasting on October 13, December 3, or December 4, 1959, and initially served to broadcast the same lectures seen on the closed-circuit system until additional educational programming was added in February 1960. The station originally broadcast for 15 hours a week, which within ten years had grown to 57 hours a week. In March 1970, a translator on channel 72 was set up to provide service to schools in Dayton. An affiliate of National Educational Television, WMUB became part of PBS when it was constituted later in 1970. The station also broadcast several local programs focusing on community and public affairs issues. The variety program Studio 14 gave television executive Rick Ludwin, later of NBC, his start in broadcasting.

In 1971, the Ohio Educational Television Network Commission acquired the license and transmitter of WKTR-TV, a failed commercial station in Kettering (near Dayton), returning it to the air as an educational television station under the WOET-TV call sign on April 24, 1972. WOET-TV began by rebroadcasting WMUB-TV. WMUB-TV, in turn, rebroadcast PBS programs from WCET in Cincinnati; the first week of programs on WOET was plagued by issues because WCET, the ultimate off-air source for the programs, held a local pledge drive. While the Network Commission intended a consortium of Miami University, Central State University, and Wright State University to run WOET-TV, they continued to quarrel over the shape of their partnership to run channel 16; Wright State objected to the inclusion of Miami, which the commission had insisted on because of its existing studios and previous television experience, and believed it should be the sole operator of the Dayton station. It ultimately relented and agreed to the tri-university consortium. Plans for the consortium, to be known as University Regional Broadcasting (URB), took a step forward in 1974, when WMUB-TV was added to the proposed design of the group; eventually, separate programming for the two stations was foreseen. On April 22, 1975, the FCC approved the transfer of the WOET-TV license from the Network Commission to University Regional Broadcasting, with the tri-university consortium taking over on July 1. The stations changed their call letters on March 1, 1977, from WOET-TV to WPTD (Public Television in Dayton) and from WMUB-TV to WPTO (Public Television in Oxford).

=== Split programming ===
In 1988, WPTD moved to new studios in the Transportation Center in downtown Dayton. The new studios also helped lay the groundwork for providing separate programming from WPTD and WPTO. Over a year between late 1986 and late 1987, fewer than 10 programs were aired separately on one station or the other. However, it was not until transmitter improvements at both Dayton and Oxford created services with signal overlap that this vision was deemed feasible. This eventually came to pass on July 1, 1992, when WPTO began airing a secondary lineup of primarily instructional and educational programs as well as documentaries and rebroadcasts of key PBS shows in different time periods. WPTO was added to the major cable systems in Cincinnati and Dayton in 1993. WPTO's program lineup also included international shows from Britain and Japan.

=== Since 2000 ===
In 2000, the ThinkTV stations and WCET began sharing a senior executive, Scott Elliott, who had previously only worked at WCET. While the employee-sharing did not represent a merger, it paved the way for further collaboration between the public broadcasters, who had talked four times in 25 years about merging. On October 31, 2008, Greater Dayton Public Television and the Greater Cincinnati Television Educational Foundation (CET), owner of WCET, announced plans to merge their resources into one non-profit organization serving all of Southwest Ohio while maintaining separate identities. In May 2009, after two years of discussions, Public Media Connect was formed as a merger of the two groups, with each continuing as local nonprofits and subsidiaries. The merger resulted in the July 2010 transfer of WCET's master control operations to ThinkTV's facilities in Dayton.

== Technical information ==
=== Subchannels ===
WPTD's digital signal is multiplexed. On June 5, 2023, WPTO began broadcasting two of the four subchannels of WCVN-TV in Covington, Kentucky, a transmitter of Kentucky Educational Television (KET), as part of a partnership between KET and Public Media Connect; KET provides transmission capacity in 3.0 format for WCET and WPTO (as well as datacasting capabilities for both organizations) and vice versa in 1.0 format. Fiber-optic links deliver signals between Public Media Connect's master control in Dayton and KET's in Lexington. This was the first partnership between separately owned public broadcasters.

Subchannels of WPTO
Subchannel	Res.	Short name	Programming
14.1	720p	WPTO-HD	PBS
14.2	480i	Explore	ThinkTV 14 Explore
14.3	480i	Kids	PBS Kids
14.4	480i	Ohio	The Ohio Channel
54.2	720p	KET2	KET / PBS (WCVN-TV)
54.4	480i	KETKIDS	PBS Kids (WCVN-TV)

Broadcast on behalf of another station

WPTO's subchannels from 2004 to 2009 were 14.2: a simulcast of analog channel 14; 14.3: "Prime", repeats of channel 14's prime time programming; 14.4: "Learn", PBS Kids and college telecourses; 14.5: the World Channel; and 14.6: distinct high-definition programming from PBS, simulcast on WPTD 16.6. By sometime in 2008, 14.5 "World" was also carrying programming from The Ohio Channel overnight.

After analog broadcasting ceased on May 1, 2009, WPTO realigned its subchannels: 14.1 began carrying former analog channel 14's programming in high definition and widescreen; "Prime" moved to 14.2; "Learn" moved to 14.3; "World" moved to 14.4; 14.5 became a standard-definition simulcast of 14.1; and 14.6 was dropped.

On January 16, 2017, other programming was dropped from 14.3, leaving it to carry PBS Kids 24/7.

Sometime in 2023, possibly when WPTO started broadcasting WCVN-TV's subchannels, 14.5 was dropped.

After a December 2025 announcement, ThinkTV rebranded two of WPTO's subchannels effective January 5, 2026: 14.2 was rebranded as "Explore", continuing some prime time repeats and adding international programming from the World Channel. 14.4 was rebranded as "Ohio", dropping World Channel programming and continuing to carry The Ohio Channel, now 24/7. Similar changes were also made to WPTD.

=== Over-the-air broadcasting ===
WPTO broadcasts from a facility co-located with Cincinnati's WXIX-TV near the Western Hills Viaduct.

The station began broadcasting a digital signal from a transmitter on channel 28 in Cincinnati on June 28, 2004. ThinkTV ceased analog broadcasting from Dayton and Oxford on May 1, 2009, earlier than the June 12 national transition deadline, with WPTO continuing to use channel 28. WPTO moved its digital signal from channel 28 to channel 29 on October 18, 2019, as part of the FCC's spectrum reallocation process. WPTO operated at low power from that date until work was completed on May 1, 2020.
