= WGCT-CD =

Television station in Columbus, Ohio

- Columbus, Ohio; United States
- Channels: Digital: 8 (VHF); Virtual: 39

Programming
- Affiliations: 39.1: TCT; for others, see § Subchannels

Ownership
- Owner: Central Ohio Association of Christian Broadcasters, Inc.
- Sister stations: WOCB-CD, WXCB-CD, WQIZ-LD

History
- Founded: November 10, 1983
- First air date: September 30, 1985
- Former call signs: W08BV (1983–1998); WINJ-LP (1998–2006); WGCT-CA (2006–2010)
- Former affiliations: UATV; Independent

Technical information
- Licensing authority: FCC
- Facility ID: 66172
- Class: CD
- ERP: 3 kW
- HAAT: 98 m (322 ft)
- Transmitter coordinates: 39°58′16″N 83°1′40″W

Links
- Public license information: Public file; LMS
- Website: coacb.org

WGCT-CD (channel 39) is a low-power, Class A television station in Columbus, Ohio, United States, affiliated with Total Christian Television (TCT). The station is owned by the Central Ohio Association of Christian Broadcasters, and is relayed on WOCB-CD in Marion, WXCB-CD in Delaware and WQIZ-LD in Ashland.

== History ==
=== W08BV era (1983–1998) ===
In 1983, the station's construction permit was assigned by the Federal Communications Commission (FCC). The station began broadcasting in 1985, under the callsign of W08BV, as the first low-power television station in the Columbus media market. In its first years on the air, it aired syndicated programming, and it also boasted an in-house sports broadcasting unit. Sports coverage on W08BV included football and basketball games involving more than 30 high schools in the area, mainly in Franklin County. It also held a contract to cover Ohio State Buckeyes women's basketball, women's gymnastics, as well as hockey and wrestling.

=== WINJ-LP/WGCT-CA era (1998–2010) ===
It changed its calls to WINJ-LP ("We're Into Jesus") in 1998 and WGCT-CA in 2006. Prior to the purchase by its current owners, the station showed a variety of programs, the bulk of which were old public domain movies, old cartoons, and religious programs, as well as children's programming created by the station. Former owner Ella Flowers (1938–2017) was featured prominently in many of the musical and religious programs. The animated segments produced by Flowers would later gain some notoriety online after a few clips of the program were uploaded to YouTube back in 2007 with no context as to their production or origins, with one upload titling the show as the Pink Morning Cartoon. Eventually, the uploads of these animated segments would be brought to the attention of many on the Internet, which set forth a search for any information and more potential footage of the cartoon.

=== WGCT-CD era (2010–present) ===
The station switched to digital on June 13, 2010, and changed its call letters to WGCT-CD. It previously broadcast at 83 watts, but has recently increased its power to 3,000 watts.

The station is not available on any local cable systems. Even with the power increase, its signal is limited to the immediate Columbus area.

== Subchannels ==
The station's signal is multiplexed:

Subchannels of WGCT-CD
| Subchannel | Res. | Short name | Programming |
|---|---|---|---|
| 39.1 | 720p | COACB | TCT |
| 39.2 | 480i | BUZZR | Buzzr |
| 39.3 | 480i | DAYSTAR | Daystar |
| 39.4 | 480i | VICTORY | Victory Network |
| 39.5 | 480i | POSITIV | Positiv |
| 39.6 | 480i | SHOPLC | Shop LC |
| 39.7 | 480i | TBA | Retro TV |
| 39.8 | 480i | RADIO | COACB Radio |
| 39.9 | 480i | GLTV | Greater Love TV |
| 39.10 | 480i | FUNROAD | Fun Roads |
