= WDTN =

Television station in Dayton, Ohio

- Dayton, Ohio; United States
- Channels: Digital: 31 (UHF), shared with WBDT and WKOI-TV; Virtual: 2
- Branding: 2 News

Programming
- Affiliations: 2.1: NBC; 2.2: Ion Mystery

Ownership
- Owner: Nexstar Media Group; (Nexstar Media Inc.)
- Sister stations: WBDT

History
- Founded: April 4, 1947
- First air date: March 15, 1949
- Former call signs: WLWD (1949–1976)
- Former channel numbers: Analog: 5 (VHF, 1949–1953), 2 (VHF, 1953–2009); Digital: 50 (UHF, 2000–2019)
- Former affiliations: NBC (1949–1980); DuMont (secondary, 1949–1955); ABC (secondary 1949–1971, primary 1980–2004)
- Call sign meaning: Dayton

Technical information
- Licensing authority: FCC
- Facility ID: 65690
- ERP: 1,000 kW
- HAAT: 330 m (1,083 ft)
- Transmitter coordinates: 39°43′8″N 84°15′21.1″W

Links
- Public license information: Public file; LMS
- Website: www.wdtn.com

WDTN (channel 2) is a television station in Dayton, Ohio, United States, affiliated with NBC. It is owned by Nexstar Media Group, which provides certain services to CW station WBDT (channel 26) under a local marketing agreement (LMA) with Vaughan Media. The two stations share studios on South Dixie Drive in Moraine (with a Dayton mailing address).

WDTN's transmitter facility is located off Frytown Road in an exclave of Jefferson Township surrounded by the southwest Dayton neighborhoods of Germantown Meadow, Highview Hills and Stoney Ridge; through a channel sharing agreement, it shares its digital channel with WBDT, along with unrelated Richmond, Indiana–licensed Ion Television station WKOI-TV (channel 43).

== History ==
=== Early years ===
The construction permit for what is now WDTN was awarded to the Crosley Broadcasting Corporation of Cincinnati on April 4, 1947. It was the first broadcast television license granted by the Federal Communications Commission (FCC) to Dayton. However, due to several delays, the station did not actually go on the air until March 15, 1949, as WLWD, on channel 5, twenty days after CBS affiliate WHIO-TV began broadcasting. From the very first day, it has operated from a studio and office facility located in a former skating rink on Dixie Drive in Moraine. (The property has changed jurisdictions since the original airdate: first it was within the now-defunct Van Buren Township, which voted to incorporate as Kettering in November 1952; in 1953, the western portion of Kettering, which included the property, voted to secede, forming Moraine Township, which in turn incorporated as Moraine in 1957.)

WLWD was the second link of a group of inter-connected stations which made up the "WLW Television Network", and was named for Crosley's flagship Cincinnati radio station WLW; the "D" referred to Dayton. The other stations were WLWT in Cincinnati and WLWC (now WCMH-TV) in Columbus, both also owned by Crosley. The three outlets shared common regional programming, most of which was produced in Cincinnati and sent by way of microwave link to Dayton and Columbus (such as The 50-50 Club with Ruth Lyons, and later Bob Braun; The Paul Dixon Show; and Midwestern Hayride). All three stations were also NBC affiliates, and had secondary relationships with the DuMont Television Network; WLWD also carried ABC programs. The first program shown on WLWD was NBC's Texaco Star Theater, with Milton Berle. To reflect their connection to each other, the WLW Television stations hyphenated their call signs on air; the Dayton outlet was known as WLW-D. The Crosley television group would later expand to include WLWA (now WXIA-TV) in Atlanta, WLWI (now WTHR) in Indianapolis, and WOAI-TV in San Antonio.

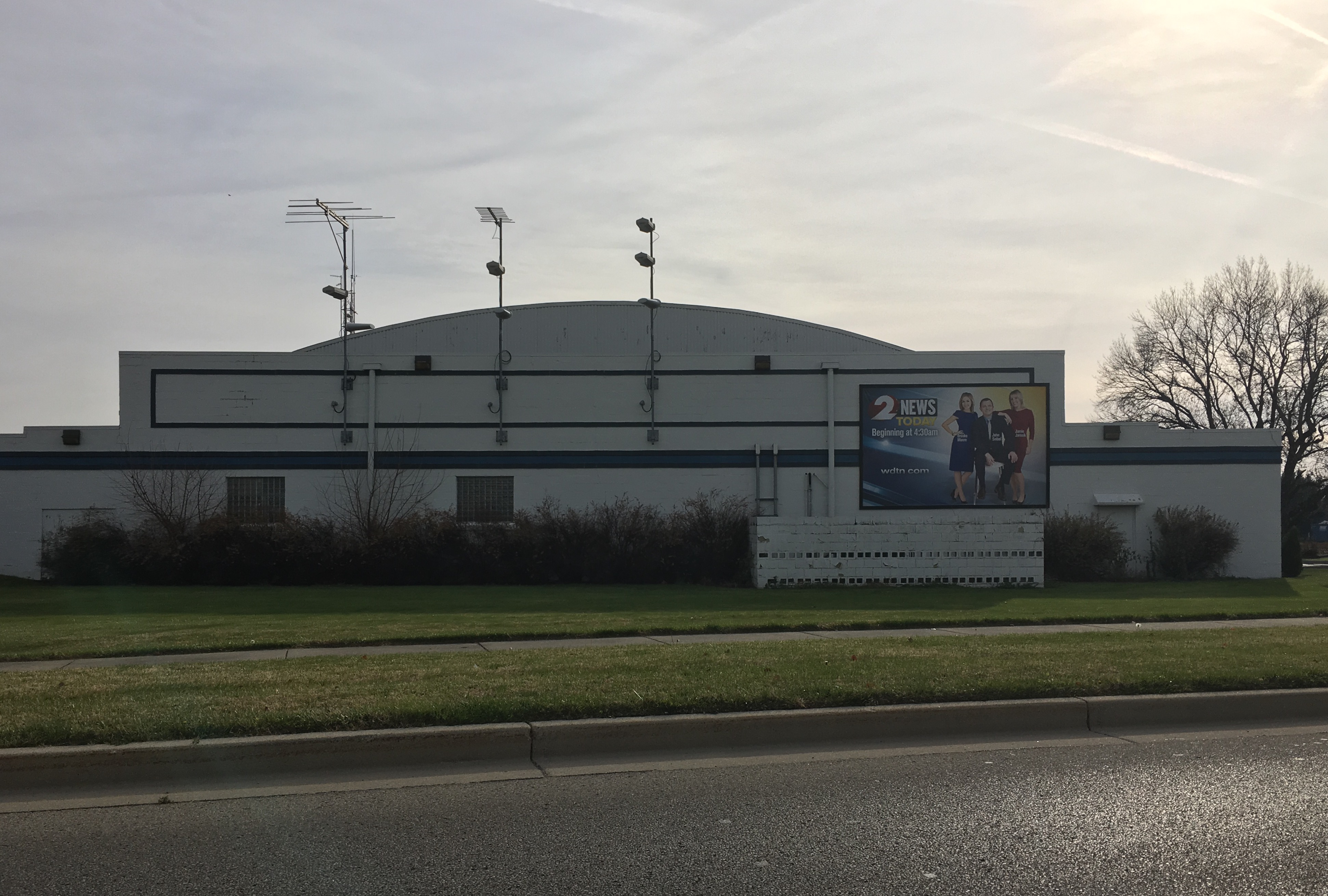
WDTN's studio in Moraine, Ohio

The release of the FCC's Sixth Report and Order in 1952 resulted in shifts of VHF channel assignments in the Midwest region. In Ohio, WLWD's channel 5 allocation was moved to Cincinnati and given to sister station WLWT, with the Dayton station reassigned to transmit over channel 2. WLWD's channel change took place on April 27, 1953. WHIO-TV, Dayton's only other station at the time, also shifted channels (from 13 to 7) as a result of the same ordinance. Along with the channel shift WLWD was also forced to operate with a shorter transmission tower, to reduce the overlap of its new channel 2 signal with the relocated signals of WLWT (which moved from channel 4 to channel 5) and WLWC (which shifted to channel 4 from channel 3). The analog channel 2 signal traveled a very long distance under normal conditions.

WLWD lost DuMont in 1955, a few months before the network shut down. It lost ABC in 1965 (though it cleared some ABC daytime programming until 1971 as a secondary affiliate) when then-independent WONE-TV (channel 22, now WKEF) picked up ABC's prime time programming.

In 1968 the Crosley group took on the name of its parent company and became known as Avco Broadcasting, a subsidiary of the Aviation Corporation (later known as Avco). After the FCC restricted the common ownership of stations with overlapping signals in the late 1960s, it grandfathered Avco's common ownership of WLWD, WLWT, WLWC and of WLW radio in Cincinnati. Even from its shorter tower, WLWD's city-grade signal reached as far as Cincinnati and as far north as the Columbus suburbs, while WLW radio's 50-kilowatt signal covered nearly all of Ohio and overlapped with all three television stations.

In 1975, Avco decided to exit broadcasting. As a result, WLWD lost its grandfathered protection, and had to be sold off separately from WLWT and WLWC. WLWD ended up being the last of Avco's television stations to be sold off, going to Grinnell College in Iowa for $13 million in June 1975; the acquisition made Grinnell College one of a few universities in the country to own a commercial television station. The school changed the call letters to WDTN shortly after the sale closed on June 16, 1976. Not long after Grinnell took over, WDTN increased the height on its broadcast tower and began operating at full effective radiated power, increasing its coverage area. (The WLWD call sign was used from April 2003 until April 2010 for an FM radio station serving Lima, now WBKS. The call sign has been used since October 12, 2010, by Daystar station WLWD-LD (channel 20), licensed to Springfield.)

=== Switch to ABC ===
By the mid to late-1970s, ABC was searching for stronger affiliates in order to cement its status as the leading network in the United States. Its existing Dayton affiliate, WKEF, was a distant third in the ratings, and only ran ABC's prime time and sports programming, plus whatever daytime programming was preempted by two Taft Broadcasting–owned ABC affiliates in adjacent markets, WKRC-TV in Cincinnati (now with CBS) and WTVN-TV (now WSYX) in Columbus. WKEF also did not have a functioning news department until 1979. Meanwhile, WKRC-TV and WTVN-TV were not only preempting ABC's daytime programs, but also its late night shows and some of its Saturday morning cartoons. ABC also wanted a station in Dayton with both stronger ratings and signal, and one which could reach portions of the Cincinnati and Columbus markets. In summer 1979, ABC approached WDTN and reached an affiliation deal. Almost by default, NBC was then left to go with WKEF. On January 1, 1980, WDTN and WKEF swapped network affiliations. Five months after joining ABC, in May 1980, Grinnell College announced it would sell WDTN to the broadcasting division of the Hearst Corporation. The sale was finalized over a year later, in September 1981 for a price of over $47 million.

In August 1997, Hearst's television group merged with Argyle Television Holdings II to form what was then known as Hearst-Argyle Television. Argyle had purchased WDTN's former sister station, WLWT, that January, as part of a trade deal between Argyle II and Gannett Broadcasting which caused WLWT and its Oklahoma City sister station, KOCO-TV, to swap ownership with WZZM in Grand Rapids, Michigan, and WGRZ-TV in Buffalo, New York. For the same reason that forced the breakup of Avco's television group 20 years earlier, Hearst-Argyle could not keep both stations (common ownership of stations with overlapping city-grade signals would not be allowed until 2000). It opted to keep the larger WLWT and trade WDTN, together with WNAC-TV in Providence, Rhode Island, to Sunrise Television for WPTZ in Plattsburgh, New York, WNNE in Hartford, Vermont, and KSBW in Salinas, California. The sale was finalized on July 2, 1998.

In May 2002, Sunrise merged with LIN TV; both television companies were owned by private equity firm Hicks, Muse, Tate & Furst.

=== Return to NBC ===
In early 2004, NBC landed a new affiliation agreement with LIN TV; in response to this agreement, ABC signed an affiliation deal with Sinclair Broadcasting Group, which renewed the network's affiliations with the group's existing ABC affiliates and caused WKEF and its sister stations in Springfield/Decatur, Illinois (WICS and WICD), to switch to that network. On August 30, 2004, in a reversal of the 1980 switch, WDTN returned to NBC after 24 years away to take advantage of the network's then-stronger programming. Ironically, several months after the affiliation shift, ABC's ratings overtook those of NBC and the network wouldn't rebound for nearly a decade; in 2014, NBC had regained the lead over ABC.

On May 18, 2007, LIN TV announced that it was exploring strategic alternatives that could have resulted in the sale of the company. In early June, WDTN's website (along with those of several other LIN TV-owned stations not affiliated with Fox such as WNDY-TV, WWHO, WAND, WWLP, and WLFI-TV) underwent a redesign. The web addresses were then operated by the Local Media Network division of World Now for a little over a year until October 2008, when LIN TV relaunched most of its station websites through Fox Interactive Media (later spun off as the independent company known today as EndPlay). Prior to the World Now contract, the web addresses were powered by Web Pros.

On October 3, 2008, LIN TV pulled WDTN (and its other stations) from Time Warner Cable, due to a dispute over "retransmission fees". Time Warner replaced WDTN with a free preview of HBO Family.

On October 29, LIN TV and Time Warner Cable reached an agreement, restoring WDTN, as well as offering it in high definition on the cable system for the first time.

On June 4, 2010, it was announced LIN TV would begin operating CW affiliate WBDT (then owned by ACME Communications) through shared service and joint sales agreements. Three months later, LIN TV exercised an option to purchase that channel along with another LIN-operated ACME station, fellow CW affiliate WCWF in Green Bay, Wisconsin. LIN TV requested WBDT's license be assigned to a subsidiary of Vaughan Media (owner of CW affiliate KNVA in Austin, Texas, which was also operated by LIN TV). The company holds a 4.5% equity stake in Vaughan Media, but controls most of that company's voting stock, effectively making it a shell corporation for LIN TV. WBDT was integrated into WDTN's facilities and the merger between the two stations occurred sometime around October 2010. WBDT originally had studios at Corporate Place in Miamisburg, along Byers Road.

On March 4, 2011, LIN TV's contract with DISH Network expired, and all TV stations owned or operated by LIN, including WDTN and WBDT, were pulled from DISH. On March 13, LIN and DISH entered into a retransmission consent agreement, and all affected channels were restored.

On March 21, 2014, Media General announced that it would buy LIN. The FCC approved the merger on December 12, 2014, but a condition of the deal requires Media General to end the JSA between WBDT and WDTN due to tighter scrutiny such deals are getting by the FCC. Media General received a two-year waiver to end the JSA between WDTN and WBDT. The merger was completed on December 19, reuniting WDTN with WCMH-TV (the former WLWC).

On January 27, 2016, it was announced that Nexstar Broadcasting Group would buy Media General for $4.6 billion, and WDTN became part of "Nexstar Media Group". The deal was approved by the FCC on January 11, 2017, and it was completed on January 17.

A carriage dispute with AT&T, lasting from 11:59 p.m. on July 3 to August 29, 2019, resulted in the removal of WDTN, along with more than 120 other Nexstar stations across 97 markets, from AT&T's DirecTV, DirecTV Now and U-verse platforms.

A carriage dispute with Dish Network, beginning at 7 p.m. on December 2, 2020, resulted in the removal of WDTN and sister station WBDT from the platform, along with 164 Nexstar stations in 115 markets.

A carriage dispute with DirecTV from July 2 to September 17, 2023, resulted in the removal of WDTN, along with 158 other Nexstar stations, from DirecTV, U-verse and DirecTV Stream.

== Programming ==
Game show host and announcer Johnny Gilbert hosted his own local daytime variety/talk show on WLWD immediately after the local airing of WLW television's Paul Dixon Show in the mid-1960s.

Phil Donahue (former news anchor and radio talk show host at WHIO radio) began hosting a talk show on WLWD in 1967, called The Phil Donahue Show, that was then more issue-oriented (greatly reducing the station's program budget). Donahue's show went national in 1970. Since most programs on the WLW television regional network originated from WLWT in Cincinnati, it was the first time WLWD was the originator of a program.

Aside from Paul Dixon's weekday morning show, other Cincinnati-based programming that aired on WLWD included: The 50-50 Club, hosted by Ruth Lyons (succeeded by Bob Braun after Lyons' 1967 retirement), and the Saturday evening country music program Midwestern Hayride.

Due to WLWD's heavy local and regional programming schedule, many network programs from NBC and ABC were recorded on film as a kinescope for later airing. On rare occasions when a program was unavailable (sometimes due to network technical difficulties or if fill time was available before or after a network sportscast), a half-hour series entitled Star Performance, consisting mostly of drama pilots from the 1950s, would air. Fifteen-minute mini-documentaries or newsreels would also air as a time filler under the title Miniature Theater.

During the summer of 1983, WDTN was exempted from running ABC's soap operas after 2 p.m., since WKRC-TV's signal easily covered Dayton. As a result, the station ran cartoons and off-network sitcoms in place of One Life to Live and General Hospital. By the late 1980s, these were replaced with first run talk shows such as The Oprah Winfrey Show (at 4 p.m.), The Montel Williams Show, and The Jerry Springer Show. WDTN would begin its talk block at 2 p.m. during the week. In 2000, Time Warner Cable (Dayton's largest cable system) dropped the Cincinnati network affiliates to make room for new cable channels. The Cincinnati stations had been available on cable in the Dayton area ever since cable arrived there in the mid-1960s. As a result, ABC soap viewers could no longer see One Life to Live or General Hospital, while over-the-air viewers could still pick them up on WCPO-TV (which had become Cincinnati's ABC affiliate in 1996). In the fall of 2000, General Hospital returned to WDTN's schedule; after the station came under the control of LIN TV in May 2002, One Life to Live was added to the schedule as well. From this point on, WDTN aired the entire ABC schedule in pattern until the station returned to NBC in 2004.

=== News operation ===
In the 1970s and 1980s, WDTN used the Eyewitness News branding. For most of its history, its newscasts have been a runner-up to market leader WHIO-TV. On April 11, 2012, the station announced that it was in the process of reconstructing its studios in preparation for the production of high definition content. After June 8, 2012, newscasts were moved to the station's newsroom as the new news set was being built in the same location as the old one. The first high definition newscast was at 6 p.m. on Saturday, July 21, 2012. WDTN was the second station in Dayton to have made the upgrade to HD newscasts; the shows on WBDT were included in the upgrade.

On August 20, 2007, the station began to produce a nightly prime time newscast for WBDT, known as 2 News at 10 on Dayton's CW. This show achieved higher ratings than WRGT-TV's nightly prime time news in Dayton's metered market households on the 26th day of its broadcast. That year, 2 News won the "Edward R. Murrow Award for Overall Excellence" for the second straight year.

In May 2011, the station changed the name of its weekday 5–7 a.m. newscast from 2 News Sunrise to 2 News Today. On November 14, 2011, the station moved 2 News Today's start time to 4:30 a.m., probably in response to WHIO-TV's similar lengthening of its morning news on August 15.

In August 2011, the station announced plans to replace its weekday hour-long newscast, 2 News at Noon, with a local lifestyle talk show called Living Dayton, starting in early January 2012. It was planned that anchor Marsha Bonhart, Holly Samuels and meteorologist Jamie Jarosik would deliver news and weather at the top of the broadcast, and that the show would cover any breaking news. Living Dayton premiered on February 6, 2012, with newly hired hosts Nathalie Basha and Zuri Hall. Later on February 6, it was announced that Jim Bucher would join the show as a contributor. The inclusion of news headlines and a weather forecast began on February 9; on the same day, Basha and Hall began providing a brief commentary-style discussion of topical issues, sometimes with a guest contributor, immediately following the news/weather segment.

On January 7, 2013, WBDT began to air a weekday news program from 7 to 9 a.m., called 2 News Today on Dayton's CW.

In January 2015, the station renamed its hour-long 5 p.m. weekday newscast Five on 2, and included more features, interviews and longer-form stories.

On September 11, 2017, the station added an hour-long 4 p.m. weekday newscast, 2 News First at 4; it is the first and only 4 p.m. local newscast in the market.

On April 4, 2020, WDTN debuted a weekend morning newscast airing Saturdays and Sundays from 6 to 8 a.m.

On July 23, 2021, WDTN debuted a new set, with updated graphics having been rolled out in the preceding weeks.

On September 2, 2021, Mark Allan, anchor for over 25 years, retired from broadcasting. Allan arrived at the station in fall 1995 from KAKE (TV) in Wichita, Kansas, first anchoring coverage of the then-ongoing Dayton Peace Accords.

WDTN includes segments from the syndicated consumer and personal finance series Money Talks with Stacy Johnson as part of its newscasts.

The station maintains news partnerships with several area newspapers. In addition to its main studios, WDTN operates bureaus in Springfield (on West Main Street) and in Xenia (in the Xenia Daily Gazette newsroom on South Detroit Street).

WDTN operates its own weather radar known on-air as "Live Doppler 2 HD" (formerly as "Live Doppler 2X"). The station's weather reports are branded as "Storm Team 2" and were sometimes branded as "Live Doppler 2X".

For many years, Charlie Van Dyke was the voice heard on WDTN's station IDs, news intros, promos, and other voice-over work. In September 2011, Van Dyke was replaced by Roger Rose.

==== Notable former on-air staff ====
- Len Berman – news and sports reporter
- Fran Charles – weekend sports anchor
- Julie Chen – reporter and anchor
- Jodine Costanzo – reporter
- Phil Donahue – host of The Phil Donahue Show, as described above
- Johnny Gilbert – local talk-variety show host in mid-1960s, as described above
- Gordon Jump – host of Gordon Jump's Fun Time and High Time; also WLWD's director of special broadcast services (1961–1965)
- Jessica Moore – reporter
- Dan Patrick – sports anchor
- John Seibel – anchor

== Technical information ==
=== Subchannels ===
Subchannels of WDTN, WBDT, and WKOI-TV
License	Subchannel	Res.	Short name	Programming
WDTN	2.1	1080i	WDTN HD	NBC
WDTN	2.2	480i	ESCAPE	Ion Mystery
WDTN	45.4	480i	Charge!	Charge! (WRGT-TV)
WBDT	26.1	1080i	WBDT HD	The CW
WBDT	26.2	480i	Bounce	Bounce TV
WKOI-TV	43.1	480i	ION TV	Ion

Broadcast on behalf of another station

On January 1, 2016, WDTN added the Escape network (now Ion Mystery) to its lineup on its second digital subchannel, replacing a standard-definition feed of the main WDTN programming previously airing on that subchannel. On January 31, 2016, the station added the Justice Network to its third digital subchannel. On February 1, 2018, the Justice Network was dropped, replaced by Ion Television, which was moved from sister station WBDT's DT3 subchannel.

On June 7, 2018, unrelated WKOI-TV began sharing WDTN's digital channel, with Ion Television programming appearing on virtual channel 43.1. WDTN also continued to carry Ion Television on virtual channel 2.3.

Sister station WBDT began sharing WDTN's digital channel on June 29, 2018; on that date, virtual channel 2.3 was dropped.

=== Analog-to-digital conversion ===
WDTN shut down its analog signal, over VHF channel 2, on June 12, 2009, the official date on which full-power television stations in the United States transitioned from analog to digital broadcasts under federal mandate. The station's digital signal remained on its pre-transition UHF channel 50, using virtual channel 2. WDTN moved its digital signal from channel 50 to channel 31 on November 8, 2019, as part of the FCC's spectrum reallocation process.

== See also ==
- Channel 2 virtual TV stations in the United States
- Channel 31 digital TV stations in the United States
- List of television stations in Ohio
- List of television stations in Ohio (by channel number)
- List of television stations in the United States by call sign (initial letter W)
