= Maplewood, Ohio =

Unincorporated community in Ohio, United States

Coordinates: 40°22′32″N 84°01′27″W

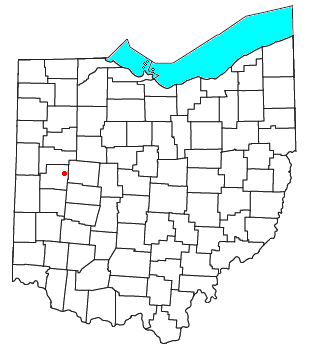
Location of Maplewood, Ohio

Maplewood is an unincorporated community in northern Salem Township, Shelby County, Ohio, United States. It has a post office with the ZIP code 45340. It lies along State Route 65.

== History ==
A post office called Maplewood has been in operation since 1880. Growth remained static until the railroad was extended to the site in 1892. The Detroit, Toledo and Ironton Railroad (now Genesee and Wyoming-owned Indiana and Ohio Railway) continues to run through this community.
