= Channel 25 =

Channel 25 may refer to several television stations:

- Channel 25 (Mongolia), a commercial television channel in Mongolia
- Chérie 25, a French television channel
- Net 25, a Philippine terrestrial/cable television network
- BPTV25, a Binh Phuoc Television station (before 2008) in Vietnam

== Canada ==
The following television stations broadcast on digital channel 25 (UHF frequencies covering 536-542 MHz) in Canada:

- CBLFT-DT in Toronto, Ontario
- CBOT-DT in Ottawa, Ontario
- CBVT-DT in Quebec City, Quebec
- CKRT-DT-2 in Dégelis, Quebec

The following television stations operate on virtual channel 25 in Canada:

- CBLFT-DT in Toronto, Ontario
- CFVS-DT in Val-d'Or, Quebec

== See also ==
- Channel 25 TV stations in Mexico
- Channel 25 digital TV stations in the United States
- Channel 25 low-power TV stations in the United States
- Channel 25 virtual TV stations in the United States
