= Cheviot, Ohio =

- City
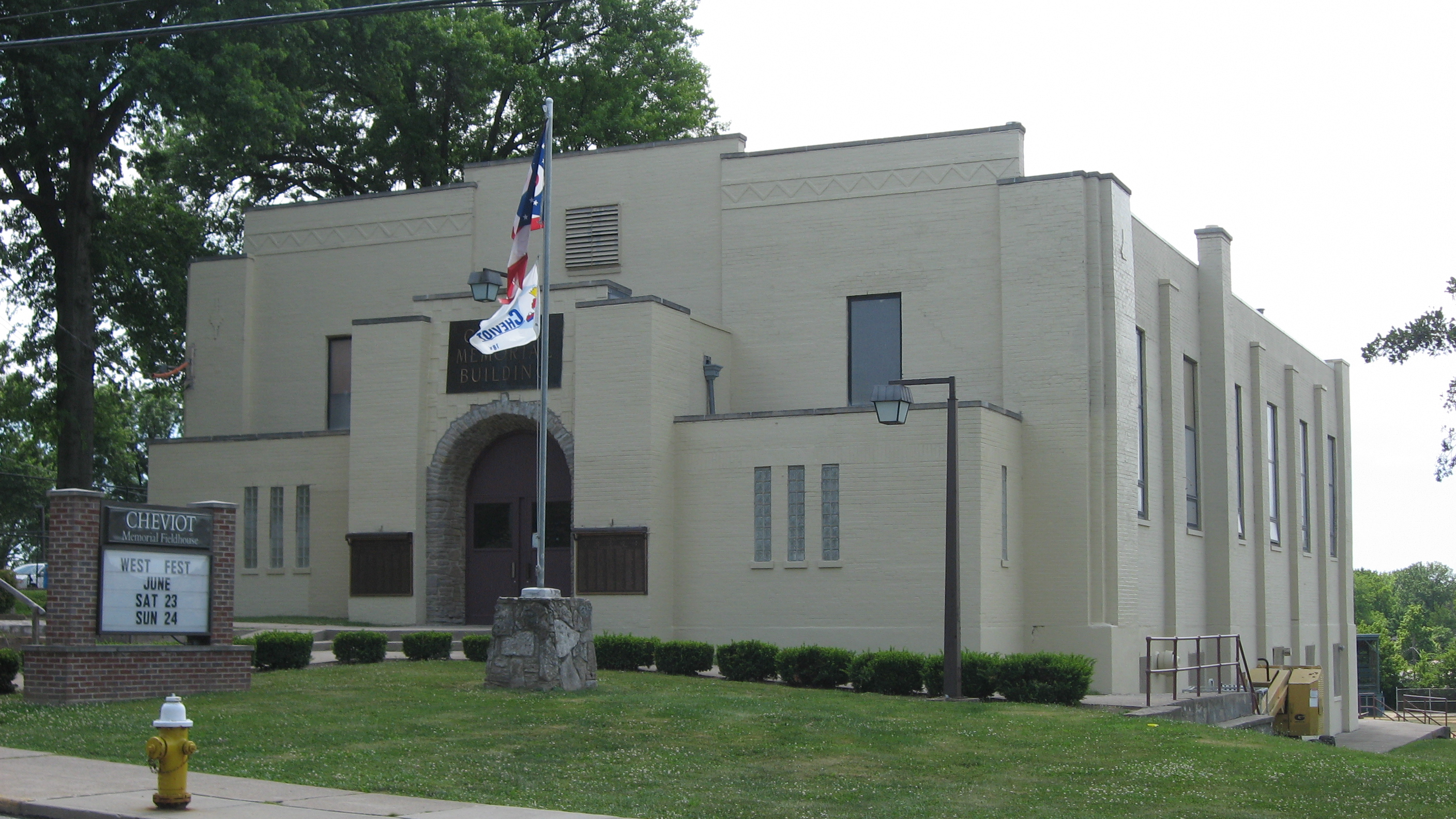
- Cheviot's 1930s fieldhouse and community center

- Flag Logo
- Motto: "Big City Spirit - Small Town Charm"
- Interactive map of Cheviot, Ohio
- Location within Ohio Location within the United States
- Coordinates: 39°09′15″N 84°37′15″W
- Country: United States
- State: Ohio
- County: Hamilton

Government
  - Mayor: Samuel D. Keller (D)

Area
  - Total: 1.17 sq mi (3.02 km^{2})
  - Land: 1.17 sq mi (3.02 km^{2})
  - Water: 0 sq mi (0.00 km^{2})
- Elevation: 919 ft (280 m)

Population (2020)
  - Total: 8,658
  - Estimate (2023): 8,565
  - Density: 7,422.9/sq mi (2,865.99/km^{2})
- Time zone: UTC-5 (Eastern (EST))
  - Summer (DST): UTC-4 (EDT)
- ZIP code: 45211
- Area code: 513
- FIPS code: 39-14128
- GNIS feature ID: 1086200
- Website: cheviot.org

Cheviot (/ˈʃɛviət/ SHEV-ee-ət) is a city in west-central Hamilton County, Ohio, United States. It is a suburb of Cincinnati. The population was 8,658 at the 2020 census.

== History ==
In 1818, a Scottish immigrant named John Craig purchased a half section of 320 acres (1.3 km^{2}) of Green Township from Elias Boudinot. He built an inn and tavern on the Harrison Pike. On March 21, 1818, Craig laid out a town which he named after the Cheviot Hills in southern Scotland. He sold lots and growth began.

The town was incorporated as a village in 1901, and a city in 1931. Originally a farming community, today Cheviot is a residential suburb of Cincinnati.

== Geography ==
Cheviot is located about 7 miles (11 km) northwest of downtown Cincinnati. According to the United States Census Bureau, the city has a total area of 1.17 square miles (3.03 km^{2}), all land.

=== Climate ===
Climate data for Cheviot, Ohio, 1991–2020 normals, extremes 1970–present
Month	Jan	Feb	Mar	Apr	May	Jun	Jul	Aug	Sep	Oct	Nov	Dec	Year
Record high °F (°C)	68 (20)	76 (24)	85 (29)	88 (31)	93 (34)	101 (38)	103 (39)	102 (39)	100 (38)	97 (36)	81 (27)	74 (23)	103 (39)
Mean maximum °F (°C)	61.2 (16.2)	65.3 (18.5)	75.1 (23.9)	82.2 (27.9)	88.1 (31.2)	92.3 (33.5)	94.3 (34.6)	93.8 (34.3)	90.8 (32.7)	83.2 (28.4)	72.0 (22.2)	63.7 (17.6)	95.5 (35.3)
Mean daily maximum °F (°C)	37.4 (3.0)	42.0 (5.6)	51.9 (11.1)	64.8 (18.2)	74.0 (23.3)	81.8 (27.7)	85.4 (29.7)	84.6 (29.2)	78.2 (25.7)	66.0 (18.9)	52.5 (11.4)	41.6 (5.3)	63.4 (17.4)
Daily mean °F (°C)	29.8 (−1.2)	33.3 (0.7)	42.2 (5.7)	53.9 (12.2)	63.6 (17.6)	72.0 (22.2)	75.4 (24.1)	74.3 (23.5)	67.5 (19.7)	55.7 (13.2)	43.7 (6.5)	34.3 (1.3)	53.8 (12.1)
Mean daily minimum °F (°C)	22.2 (−5.4)	24.7 (−4.1)	32.6 (0.3)	43.0 (6.1)	53.3 (11.8)	62.1 (16.7)	65.4 (18.6)	64.0 (17.8)	56.8 (13.8)	45.3 (7.4)	34.9 (1.6)	27.0 (−2.8)	44.3 (6.8)
Mean minimum °F (°C)	1.3 (−17.1)	5.7 (−14.6)	14.8 (−9.6)	27.3 (−2.6)	37.4 (3.0)	49.7 (9.8)	55.5 (13.1)	53.9 (12.2)	43.0 (6.1)	31.0 (−0.6)	20.0 (−6.7)	10.1 (−12.2)	−1.1 (−18.4)
Record low °F (°C)	−23 (−31)	−9 (−23)	−4 (−20)	17 (−8)	28 (−2)	38 (3)	47 (8)	45 (7)	30 (−1)	22 (−6)	11 (−12)	−24 (−31)	−24 (−31)
Average precipitation inches (mm)	3.59 (91)	3.19 (81)	4.47 (114)	4.91 (125)	5.21 (132)	4.85 (123)	4.32 (110)	3.47 (88)	3.32 (84)	3.47 (88)	3.42 (87)	3.96 (101)	48.18 (1,224)
Average snowfall inches (cm)	6.0 (15)	4.3 (11)	2.4 (6.1)	0.2 (0.51)	0.0 (0.0)	0.0 (0.0)	0.0 (0.0)	0.0 (0.0)	0.0 (0.0)	0.3 (0.76)	0.2 (0.51)	2.6 (6.6)	16.0 (41)
Average extreme snow depth inches (cm)	4.1 (10)	3.8 (9.7)	2.2 (5.6)	0.1 (0.25)	0.0 (0.0)	0.0 (0.0)	0.0 (0.0)	0.0 (0.0)	0.0 (0.0)	0.2 (0.51)	0.4 (1.0)	2.2 (5.6)	6.4 (16)
Average precipitation days (≥ 0.01 in)	11.8	9.8	11.9	11.7	12.4	11.2	10.2	7.6	7.8	8.3	9.3	11.5	123.5
Average snowy days (≥ 0.1 in)	4.4	4.1	1.8	0.3	0.0	0.0	0.0	0.0	0.0	0.1	0.3	3.0	14.0
Source 1: NOAA
Source 2: National Weather Service

== Demographics ==
Historical population
Census	Pop.	Note	%±
1880	325		—
1910	1,930		—
1920	4,108		112.8%
1930	8,046		95.9%
1940	9,043		12.4%
1950	9,944		10.0%
1960	10,701		7.6%
1970	11,135		4.1%
1980	9,888		−11.2%
1990	9,616		−2.8%
2000	9,015		−6.2%
2010	8,375		−7.1%
2020	8,658		3.4%
2023 (est.)	8,565		−1.1%

=== 2020 census ===
As of the 2020 census, Cheviot had a population of 8,658. The median age was 36.7 years; 21.4% of residents were under the age of 18, 13.1% were 65 years of age or older, and for every 100 females there were 98.4 males with 93.9 males for every 100 females age 18 and over. The population density was 7,425.39 people per square mile (2,865.99/km^{2}). There were 3,945 households in Cheviot, of which 26.1% had children under the age of 18 living in them; 26.2% were married-couple households, 27.6% were households with a male householder and no spouse or partner present, and 34.9% were households with a female householder and no spouse or partner present. About 40.2% of all households were made up of individuals and 10.8% had someone living alone who was 65 years of age or older. The average household size was 2.27, and the average family size was 3.03. There were 4,272 housing units, of which 7.7% were vacant. Among occupied housing units, 53.5% were owner-occupied and 46.5% were renter-occupied. The homeowner vacancy rate was 2.2% and the rental vacancy rate was 6.2%. 100.0% of residents lived in urban areas, while 0% lived in rural areas.

Racial composition as of the 2020 census
Race	Number	Percent
White	6,159	71.1%
Black or African American	1,797	20.8%
American Indian and Alaska Native	27	0.3%
Asian	52	0.6%
Native Hawaiian and Other Pacific Islander	9	0.1%
Some other race	113	1.3%
Two or more races	501	5.8%
Hispanic or Latino (of any race)	228	2.6%

According to the U.S. Census American Community Survey, for the period 2016-2020 the estimated median annual income for a household in the city was $45,428, and the median income for a family was $52,229. About 20.3% of the population were living below the poverty line, including 23.5% of those under age 18 and 27.6% of those age 65 or over. About 63.6% of the population were employed, and 18.2% had a bachelor's degree or higher.

=== 2010 census ===
As of the census of 2010, there were 8,375 people, 3,779 households, and 1,931 families living in the city. The population density was 7,158.1 inhabitants per square mile (2,763.8/km^{2}). There were 4,303 housing units at an average density of 3,677.8 per square mile (1,420.0/km^{2}). The racial makeup of the city was 89.0% White, 7.3% African American, 0.2% Native American, 0.5% Asian, 0.9% from other races, and 2.1% from two or more races. Hispanic or Latino of any race were 2.0% of the population.

There were 3,779 households, of which 27.0% had children under the age of 18 living with them, 31.1% were married couples living together, 14.8% had a female householder with no husband present, 5.2% had a male householder with no wife present, and 48.9% were non-families. 39.6% of all households were made up of individuals, and 11.3% had someone living alone who was 65 years of age or older. The average household size was 2.18 and the average family size was 2.96.

The median age in the city was 34.6 years. 21.8% of residents were under the age of 18; 9.4% were between the ages of 18 and 24; 31.3% were from 25 to 44; 24.1% were from 45 to 64; and 13.3% were 65 years of age or older. The gender makeup of the city was 48.2% male and 51.8% female.

=== 2000 census ===
As of the census of 2000, there were 9,015 people, 4,064 households, and 2,202 families living in the city. The population density was 7,753.5 inhabitants per square mile (2,993.6/km^{2}). There were 4,338 housing units at an average density of 3,731.0 per square mile (1,440.5/km^{2}). The racial makeup of the city was 96.93% White, 0.79% African American, 0.18% Native American, 0.62% Asian, 0.01% Pacific Islander, 0.49% from other races, and 0.99% from two or more races. Hispanic or Latino of any race were 1.11% of the population.

There were 4,064 households, out of which 26.9% had children under the age of 18 living with them, 39.1% were married couples living together, 10.9% had a female householder with no husband present, and 45.8% were non-families. 40.0% of all households were made up of individuals, and 15.6% had someone living alone who was 65 years of age or older. The average household size was 2.17 and the average family size was 2.97.

In the city, the population was spread out, with 22.4% under the age of 18, 8.5% from 18 to 24, 33.7% from 25 to 44, 17.7% from 45 to 64, and 17.8% who were 65 years of age or older. The median age was 36 years. For every 100 females, there were 88.9 males. For every 100 females age 18 and over, there were 84.7 males.

The median income for a household in the city was $35,150, and the median income for a family was $48,947. Males had a median income of $36,886 versus $28,202 for females. The per capita income for the city was $19,686. About 5.2% of families and 7.6% of the population were below the poverty line, including 11.4% of those under age 18 and 5.8% of those age 65 or over.

== Government ==
Council Member	Party	Position
Stephanie Hawk	Democrat	President
Jenny Eilermann	Non Partisan	Clerk
Daniel Morgan	Democrat	Ward 1
Chris Watt	Non Partisan	Ward 2
Eileen Borgmann	Democrat	Ward 3
Hugo Petermann	Democrat	Ward 4
Amy Richter	Republican	At Large
Nick Jackson	Democrat	At Large
Troy D. Borgmann	Democrat	At Large

Administrator	Party	Position
Samuel Keller	Democrat	Mayor
Kimberlee Erdman-Rohr	Democrat	Law Director
Tom Braun	Non Partisan	Safety Service Director
Jeffrey Patton	Non Partisan	Police Chief
Robert Klein	Non Partisan	Fire Chief
Steve Brown	Non Partisan	City Auditor

=== Past Mayors ===
1. Henry Fischer (R) 1901
2. Fred Edward Wesselman (R) 1902-1905
3. Christian Ferdinand (Ferd) Baechle (R) 1905-1911
4. Fred Henry Altemeier (R) 1912-1917
5. Clifford Harry Hay (R) 1918-1941
6. Edward Christian Gingerich (D) 1942-1967
7. Albert William Schottelkotte (D) 1967
8. Donald Paul Bennett (R) 1968-1971
9. Louis Edgar Von Holle (D) 1972-1983
10. John Michael (Mike) Laumann (D) 1983-2003
11. Samuel David Keller (D) 2004-

== Culture ==
The city of Cheviot is home to much of the same German-American and other ethnic cultures that inhabit the surrounding Cincinnati area.

The city is known locally (and regionally) for its annual Harvest Home Fair. The fair is run by the Cheviot-Westwood Kiwanis Club and is kicked off with a parade through downtown Cheviot. Since 1855, the fair has been hosted on the same plot of land, now known as Harvest Home Park. Since 1940, it has been held each year on the weekend after Labor Day. Visitors regularly find carnival rides, retail and food vendors, games, live local music, a 4H animal show, and art and flower shows with community submissions.

The city incorporated the West Fest Street Festival in 2002, which has steadily grown in popularity. The annual event features local food, various booths/activities, children's rides, and live music. The city is part of the Cincinnati Public School district.

== Notable people ==
- Dorothy Mueller, baseball player
- Glenn Ryle, WKRC-TV Personality; host of "Skipper Ryle" and later Bowling For Dollars
- Al Schottelkotte, WCPO TV news anchor (1959–1994)
- Francis W. Shepardson, college professor, politician, and Greek letter organization leader
- Steve Tensi, former professional football quarterback
- Andy Williams, singer and television personality
