= Bowling for Dollars =

Television game show

- Genre: Game show
- Created by: Bert Claster
- Presented by: Various (see below)
- Narrated by: Various (see below)
- Country of origin: United States

Production
- Production locations: Various locations throughout the United States and Canada
- Running time: 22–24 minutes

Original release
- Network: Syndication
- Release: 1960s – February 2008

Bowling for Dollars is a television game show on which people could play the sport of bowling to win cash and sometimes prizes based on how well they bowled.

Unlike most TV game shows of the time, which were taped in either New York or Hollywood and broadcast nationally, Bowling for Dollars was produced by local TV stations and featured contestants from the immediate area. The show was actually a franchise, created by Bert Claster of Claster Television, also the creator of Romper Room. Episodes of Bowling for Dollars were taped either in a local bowling alley or on a pair of bowling lanes constructed right inside the TV studio.

The show reached its heyday in the 1970s. The most recent station to air the format was Detroit, Michigan independent station WADL, which relaunched Bowling for Dollars in September 2013.

== The show ==
The show's main set consisted of a sliding door from which the host emerged, as did the contestants, one by one. There was also a Jackpot light with a numeric display of its value, and a Pin Pal container (see below). There were also stands set up for an audience.

Local editions may have varied, but there were two musical themes used. One was a custom theme for the show's opening and close (with a short phrase to introduce each contestant). The other was played when a contestant hit the jackpot, also used for commercial bumper music in some editions. The latter was an instrumental version of "Keep the Ball Rollin'" by Al Hirt, a song originally done by Jay & the Techniques.

=== Game play ===
As each contestant appeared, the host would interview them for a couple of minutes. Then the audience camera would cue as the contestant pointed out whom he had brought along ("There's my wife Paula, there's my son Nick..."). The contestant was then instructed to pick a Pin Pal out of a container filled with postcards sent in by home viewers, then went off to the lanes where they would bowl at least two balls.

A half-hour show had seven contestants.

== Prizes ==
Each contestant received $1 for each pin knocked down (e.g., a contestant who knocked down a total of eight pins won $8, though some versions may have had a $5 minimum for fewer than five pins). A strike or spare awarded $20. The real allure of the show was the Jackpot, which was awarded to any bowler who got two consecutive Strikes. The jackpot started at $100, $200, $300, or $500 (depending on the version) and was increased by $20 each time it was not hit.

Some versions of Bowling for Dollars awarded prizes in addition to the money. In the Detroit edition of the show, a contestant who got a spare won a dinner for two at a local restaurant. If that spare was a split, they would also get two large pies from Buddy's Pizza. If the contestant got only one strike, they got to pick a pin from a "pinboard" for a prize from a local jeweler; one such prize was a genuine diamond ring. Finally, contestants breaking the jackpot got to bowl one more time, and if that was a strike (a "turkey") they would receive yet another prize, such as a recliner chair or bicycle. The Los Angeles version awarded a portable television set for three consecutive strikes and a car for four.

== Pin Pals ==
Each contestant, just before approaching the bowling lane, was instructed to pick a postcard at random out of a large, horizontally mounted container. The name on the card was then read aloud by the host. These were Pin Pal cards, allowing a viewer at home to participate in the game on TV. Whatever the contestant won, the Pin Pal won also, although in many markets the jackpot was actually split between the two of them (e.g., $8 to share with your Pin Pal). Many people wrote clever messages on their Pin Pal cards, like "Strike it rich!" A Pin Pal was only eligible once per show, in case a Pin Pal tried to send an overwhelming number of postcards at one time.

== Popular culture ==
The show's title has been so popular, it has been parodied quite a bit.

- In the movie UHF, there was a show called "Bowling for Burgers".
- On George Carlin's 1981 album, A Place for My Stuff, he announced a parody called "Bowling for Pussy" in the track "Fourth Announcements".
- It was mentioned on The Carol Burnett Show in "The Family" skits titled "The Rehearsal" and "Mama's Accident".
- It was mentioned on a Mama's Family episode titled "Grandma U.S.A." as "Bowling for Dishes".
- The Michael Moore movie, Bowling for Columbine.
- The rock band Bowling for Soup. (Famous for the song "1985".)
- In the 1987 film The Running Man, it was spoofed as "Climbing for Dollars".
- In the Humongous Entertainment video game Backyard Baseball, the co-anchor for the game, Vinnie the Gooch, will sometimes comment "Bowling for Dollars..." in a deadpan tone should a pitcher throw the ball low enough to the ground.

The show is mentioned in "Get a Load of This" by R. Crumb & His Cheap Suit Serenaders and in "No Anchovies, Please" by the J. Geils Band.

== Local editions ==
Bowling for Dollars was broadcast from TV stations serving medium to large communities all across North America. In many of these markets, the host was introduced by the announcer as "the Kingpin himself".

=== Baltimore ===
There were two separate runs. Both aired on WBAL-TV, and both sites were filmed in studio (with bowling being with a Brunswick set):

- Duckpins and Dollars

Hosts: Bailey Goss, then Chuck Thompson
This show only required contestants to make one strike for the jackpot — a significantly harder task in duckpin bowling than in standard tenpins.

- Bowling for Dollars

Hosts: Tom Cole, then Ron Riley, then Royal Parker
At one point, the show alternated between duckpin and tenpin bowlers.

=== Boston ===
This edition was titled Candlepins for Cash, featuring the regional candlepin variation of bowling, and had two separate runs:

- WNAC-TV (now WHDH), 1973–1980, hosted by Bob Gamere; originated from area bowling lanes using WOR-TV's remote truck, then at special lanes built in the basement of WNAC-TV's Government Center studio
- WXNE-TV (now WFXT), 1980–1982, hosted by Rico Petrocelli; originated from Wal-Lex lanes in Waltham (closed in 2002).

Both editions only required contestants to make one strike for the jackpot — a significantly harder task in candlepin bowling than in standard tenpins. In the last two seasons of the show, the player would get $30 for a spare plus one bonus ball, worth $2 more per pin knocked down. When a person threw a 10-box (all pins knocked down on the third ball) they got $20 plus one bonus ball.

The 2006 show Candlepins For Dollars that aired on WLVI Channel 56 was not related to this format.

=== Buffalo ===
- Station: WGR-TV/WGRZ Channel 2
- Host: Ed Kilgore
- Sites:
  - Original—In studio. (It's believed that the set shared the same studio with the news set.)
  - Revival—Dave & Buster's at the Eastern Hills Mall in Clarence, New York.

A revival of Bowling for Dollars aired between January and February 2008 on WGRZ, also hosted by Kilgore. This version, airing weekdays at 11:45 AM, was much shorter, with only one frame. It used a rotation of numerous theme songs, mostly from game shows of the 1970s.

A similar competing show, called Beat the Champ, aired on WBEN-TV during the original Channel 2 program run, hosted by Van Miller. This was one of two local-origination bowling programs on Channel 4 throughout the 1960s and 1970s, the other being a women's team-bowling program called Strikes, Spares & Misses hosted by Chuck Healy.

=== Charlotte ===
- Station: WPCQ (now WCNC) Channel 36
- Host: Larry Sprinkle
- Site: George Pappas Park Lanes
- Only runs for a short time from September 10, 1984, until September 1985.

=== Cincinnati ===
- Station: WKRC-TV Channel 12
- Host: Glenn Ryle; fill-ins included weatherman Mike Fenwick, sportscaster Dale Conquest, and WKRC radio host, Jerry Thomas.
- Site: In studio lanes. The set for Nick Clooney's daytime talk show sat atop the lanes. There was also a daytime version that featured only lady bowlers called Strikes and Spares, hosted by Jerry Thomas.
- The show first premiered on WKRC as a 13-week trial run in the fall of 1971. It became a regular series on September 3, 1972, airing live at 7:00 p.m. weeknights, later moving to 6:30 p.m.
- Gus Bailey, then-station PD, cancelled the show in the fall of 1975; its last weeknight program was Thanksgiving night.
- WKRC began a pre-recorded Saturday afternoon filler show in 1976, hosted by Dick Schorr, who also hosted the weeknight edition on sister station WTVN-TV (now WSYX) in Columbus. (WKRC-TV and WTVN-TV/WSYX were both owned by Taft Broadcasting, now they are both owned by Sinclair Broadcast Group.)

=== Cleveland ===
Had three separate runs of Bowling for Dollars. Two used in-studio lanes.

- 1st run (September to December 1972)
  - Station: WUAB Channel 43
  - Host: Wirt Cain who was primarily a Cincinnati TV personality. He would drive to Cleveland every other weekend to record 10 Bowling For Dollars shows.
  - Location: The show was recorded at Parmatown Lanes on Day Drive, which was next door to the Channel 43 studios.
- 2nd run (August to September 1973)
  - Station: WEWS Channel 5
  - Hosts: Don Webster, Paul Wilcox
- 3rd run (August 15, 1977 to January 5, 1979) - First aired weeknights at 7:00 from August 1977 to September 1978, and later moved to 5:30 PM until January 1979.
  - Station: WJW (then WJKW) Channel 8
  - Host: Dick Goddard
  - Substitute Host: Bob "Hoolihan" Wells
  - The jackpot started at $200 and increased by $20 per contestant until it was won. The top prize once went over $3000.
  - Site: In-studio lanes (Brunswick set with A2 pinsetters and custom sweeper labels. The sweeper label mentions WJKW's then-logo only and callsign).
  - Announcers: Joe Grant, Andy Hale, John FitzGerald

=== Columbus, Ohio ===
- Station: WTVN Channel 6 (Now WSYX)
- Host: Dick Schorr, Gene Fullen with Sally Flowers
- Site: Two in-studio lanes
- Aired weeknights at 7:00 PM.

=== Dallas/Fort Worth ===
- Aired on: WFAA Channel 8 ABC (August 11, 1975 – September 26, 1978), (6:30 PM Monday through Friday).
- Host: Verne Lundquist for most of the series
- Site: Forum Lanes in Grand Prairie, Texas (which at that time was the host site for PBA tournaments held in the spring) and Golden Triangle Bowl in Irving, Texas.

=== Dayton, Ohio ===
- Station: WLWD (now WDTN)
- Host: David G. McFarland
- Site: In-studio lanes (aired live)

The show aired Mon-Fri at 7:00 p.m.

=== Detroit ===
- Station: WWJ-TV/WDIV Channel 4 (original run); WADL Channel 38 (2013–present)
- Host: Bob Allison, Chuck Springer
- Site: Thunderbowl Lanes in Allen Park, MI

This was originally at Highland Lanes in Toledo, Ohio, where it was also seen on WDHO Channel 24 (now WNWO-TV). It moved to Detroit in about 1974. A revival of this show began in June 2013 on WADL, initially as a one-hour retrospective special, with a weekly half-hour series starting in September. As with the original version, the WADL version was hosted by Bob Allison and originated from Thunderbowl Lanes.

=== Flint, Michigan ===
- Station: WJRT Channel 12
- Host: Ed Phelps
- Site: Southland Lanes (now Grand Blanc Lanes), Grand Blanc Township
- Original Host: Fred Trost 1979-1980

=== Honolulu ===
- Station: KWHE Channel 14
- Site: Aiea Bowling Center, Barber's Point Bowling Center, Hickam Bowling Center, K-bay Bowling Center, Leeward Bowling Center, Pali Bowling Center, Schofield Bowling Center, and Subase Bowling Center
- Time: 4:00 p.m. - 5:30 p.m. every Saturday

=== Kansas City ===
- Station: KMBC Channel 9
- Host: Fred Broski
- Site: Originally at King Louie West Lanes in Overland Park, 2 years NKC Pro bowl, then in studio

=== Kitchener, Ontario, Canada ===
- Station: CKCO-TV Channel 13
- Host: Jim Craig (1972/73), then Bill Inkol (74-?), later Jeff Hutcheson, Tom Knowlton
- Site: Victoria Bowlerama/Twin Cities Bowl

=== Los Angeles ===
- Station: KTLA Channel 5 (July 4, 1972 -- March 4, 1977); KHJ-TV (now KCAL-TV) Channel 9 (February 27 -- September 15, 1978)
- Host: Chick Hearn (July 4, 1972 -- September 3, 1976; February 27 -- September 15, 1978); Jim Lange (September 6, 1976 -- March 4, 1977)
- Site: KTLA's version was taped in their in-studio lanes (Brunswick set), KHJ-TV's version was taped at the Grand Central Bowl in Glendale, CA.

=== Milwaukee ===
1st station

- WVTV Channel 18 (October 12, 1971 – June 1974)
  - Site: Red Carpet Lanes North (Now closed)
  - Host: Dick Johnson until October 1975. Replaced by co-hosts Lee Rothman and Tom Kohl
  - In June 1974, WVTV and station owner Gaylord Broadcasting created a different bowling show called The Bowling Game, which would air until January 4, 1987 on WVTV. It then moved to WDJT-TV where it aired until at least 1993.

2nd station

- WISN-TV Channel 12 (September 9, 1976 – January 1978)
  - Site: In studio
  - Host: Bruce Bennett

=== Minneapolis-St. Paul ===
- Station: KSTP-TV (Summer 1973 – 1979)
- Host: Tom Ryther, Johnny Canton
- Site: Village North Bowl (closed), Jim Maddens Diamond Lake South Lanes (closed), Cap'N Jacks Lanes (closed), Cedarvale Lanes. Every broadcast features customed pinsetter sweeper labels that mentions the show's program.

=== New York City ===
- Station: WOR Channel 9 (now WWOR-TV) (September 17, 1973 – October 25, 1979)
- Host: Bob Murphy, then Larry Kenney
- Site: Madison Square Garden Bowling Center (closed in 1988), then a studio in Brooklyn, located across from the Romper Room set

Host Larry Kenney later achieved national fame as the voice of Lion-O in the smash hit 1980s cartoon ThunderCats and the voice of Karate Kat in The Comic Strip. Kenney was also a regular on the Imus in the Morning radio show. During the show's run, the 48-lane Madison Square Garden Bowling Center featured red AMF Magic Triangles and 82-70 pinsetters, with Lanes 47 and 48 being directly used for the program.

=== Philadelphia ===
- Stations: WTAF-TV (now WTXF-TV); WPHL-TV
- Host: Dick Schorr (WTAF), Bob Gale (WTAF), and Tom Dooley (WPHL).
- Site: The WTAF version was taped at Willow Grove Park Lanes in 1969 (closed in 1984), moved to Andorra Key Lanes in 1972 (closed in 1979), then in the basement of their Center City studios, which also served as the studio for weekly bowling matches, while the WPHL version was taped at Boulevard Lanes (closed) in Philadelphia.

=== Pittsburgh ===
- Station: WTAE Channel 4
- Host: Nick Perry, then Ron Jaye.
- Lanes: In Studio Lanes. These same lanes were also used for Channel 4's Greater Pittsburgh Championship Bowling, a fixture on Saturday afternoons throughout the 1970s and 1980s. The In-Studio Lanes used pinboys at the time.

=== Rochester, New York ===
- Station: WOKR-TV Channel 13 (Now WHAM-TV)
- Host: Ron DiFrance, then Matt Rinaldi
- Site: In studio. (Studio's lanes also host Sunday's Junior Bowling and Brighton-Panorama TV Roll-offs hosted by sportscaster DiFrance, then Tony Distino.) In the 1970s, the studio previously used a Brunswick setup which featured A2 pinsetters with custom sweeper labels (the sweeper labels mentions the station's lineup; including the upcoming program after Bowling for Dollars). In the 1980s, the studio lanes were upgraded to an AMF set with two sets of Magic Triangles and 82-30 pinsetters (with same custom sweeper labels).

=== Sacramento ===
- Station: KXTV channel 10
- Hosts: Ken Gimblin
- Sites: Unknown.

=== San Francisco ===
- Station: KBHK-TV channel 44
- Hosts: Al Hamel.
- Sites: Unknown.
- KBHK's version ran from March 13 until September 8, 1978.

=== St. Louis ===
- Stations: KDNL-TV channel 30 (1973-1976), KTVI Channel 2 (c. 1976–1980)
- Hosts: Russ Carter (KDNL) and Morgan Hatch (KTVI).
- Sites: In studio lanes (KDNL version), Arena Bowl (KTVI version, no longer in existence)

=== Syracuse ===
- Station: WSYR-TV channel 3 (now WSTM-TV)
- Hosts: Bud Hedinger

The WSTM version was taped in the basement of the studios on James Street with a Brunswick set. The studios were also used for the taping of Challenge Bowling, a regional junior bowling show co-hosted by Marty Piraino.

=== Tampa-St. Petersburg ===
- Station: WTSP Channel 10 (then WLCY-TV); (March 1975 – January 1976)
- Host: Jim Bradley
- Site: Sunshine Bowl in Pinellas Park (closed, following hurricane damage in 2004 and, during rebuilding, a fire in 2005; since demolished and replaced by a Walmart Neighborhood Grocery)

Jimmy Ingram and his family starred in one episode.

=== Washington, D.C. ===
First Version:

- Station: WDCA Channel 20
- Host: Don Scott
- Site: A Bowl America in Arlington, Virginia, later Brunswick River Bowl in Bethesda, Maryland

Second Version:

- Station: WTTG Channel 5
- Host: Johnny Holliday
- Site: River Bowl in Bethesda, Maryland

=== Winnipeg, Manitoba, Canada ===
- Station: CKND-TV
- Host: Bob Washington
- Show Announcer: Dave Clayes
- Site: Academy Uptown Lanes. The center relocated in 2018 and is now known as Uptown Alley - a modern family entertainment complex north of the Polo Park shopping center.
- This was a five-pin edition of the show, which ran from 1979 to the mid-1980s.
- The jackpot started at $200 and increased by $15 per contestant until it was won.
- Strike or spares earned $20 for the bowler and pin pal. An open frame was scored as per five pin rules and $1 per pin was awarded.
- If a spare was made then a third ball would be allowed – if this ball was a strike, the prize was $40.
- In the initial running of the show, if the first strike was achieved and the second strike missed, the turn was over and the prize was $20. Later on, if the first strike was achieved and the second strike missed, the bowler could attempt a spare. If the spare was made, the prize was $40.
- The bowler must throw three consecutive strikes to win the jackpot.
- If a third strike attempt was missed, the prize was $40.
- Each 30-minute episode consisted of seven bowlers. One bowler among the seven would be selected at random as the Bonus Bowler. If the Bonus Bowler won the jackpot, they won an array of additional merchandise and services.

=== York-Harrisburg, Pennsylvania ===
- Station: WPMT Channel 43
- Host: Lou Castriota
- Site: Suburban Bowlerama; York, PA
- Ran from August 1984 until January 1985.
