= Al Schottelkotte =

American news anchor

- Al Schottelkotte in 1984
- Born: Albert Joseph Schottelkotte; March 19, 1927; Cheviot, Ohio, U.S.
- Died: December 25, 1996 (aged 69); Lawrenceburg, Indiana, U.S.
- Occupations: Television news anchor/reporter, journalist (print and radio journalist in early career)
- Years active: 1943–1994

Albert Joseph "Al" Schottelkotte (/ˈʃɒtəlkɒti/ SHOT-əl-kot-ee; March 19, 1927 – December 25, 1996) was an American news anchor and reporter for Cincinnati's WCPO-TV for 27 years, rising through the executive ranks at WCPO and later the Scripps Howard Foundation until his death in December 1996.

== Early life and career ==
Schottelkotte was born and grew up in the western Cincinnati suburb of Cheviot, Ohio, the son of Albert William Schottelkotte (1903–1974) and Venetta Schottelkotte (née Mentrup, 1903–1931). When he was four year old, his mother died from falling out a window. His news career began on his 16th birthday in 1943 while a sophomore in high school. During the height of World War II he was hired as a copy boy for The Cincinnati Enquirer. One month later he was promoted to general assignment reporter, making Schottelkotte the youngest journalist at that time for any major American newspaper. He ultimately attended three high schools, including St. Xavier, but left without graduating to focus on journalism.

In 1950, he began a two-year stint in the Army, serving in Korea giving lectures on current affairs. This experience, upon his return to Cincinnati, led to Schottelkotte's being hired by WSAI radio to anchor their evening newscast. He returned to the Enquirer and became a full-time columnist with his "Talk of the Town" column, which lasted several years.

== Television career ==
Ten years after WCPO-TV went on the air in 1949, general manager Mort Watters encouraged Schottelkotte to move to television, giving him the task of organizing the station's first news department, consisting of editor Marvin Arth, photographer Frank Jones, and Schottelkotte himself as news director and anchor for their 11 p.m. newscast. For a time, Schottelkotte continued to write for the Enquirer, but by 1961 he had abandoned print journalism to focus on broadcasting.

Schottelkotte's tireless work ethic, paired with his terse and prudent on-air delivery made him synonymous with Cincinnati television news, and easily earned him the nickname "The Voice of Cincinnati". Within one year of becoming news anchor at Channel 9, Schottelkotte supplanted WLWT's Peter Grant as the number one news anchor in Cincinnati. Schottelkotte's newscasts, which would bear his name, consistently led in TV ratings from 1960 to 1982, with shares sometimes leading all of the competing Cincinnati newscasts combined. He was unseated as Cincinnati's news leader in 1982 by WKRC-TV's anchor, Nick Clooney, a long-time talk show favorite in Cincinnati and father of actor George Clooney.

1975 TV Guide ad for "The Al Schottelkotte News"

For many years Schottelkotte anchored the news six days a week (Sunday through Friday), making him far and away the most visible news anchor in Cincinnati. Over time, he took to beginning each newscast with a precis of the day's headlines, and then ending with his signature signoff: "That's it for now. So until tomorrow, may it all be good news... to you."

=== Innovations ===
Schottelkotte contributed to numerous pioneering facets of local news:

- The Spotlight Report, which he created for radio in 1953. He brought it to television and continued it until he ended his broadcast career in 1994.
- He spearheaded the expansion of WCPO's newscasts to a half-hour (from 15 minutes) and created newscast slots at 6 p.m. and even a "noon report" broadcast, which he himself anchored until 1967 (at the time a newscast at noon was rare in television news).
- Schottelkotte relied heavily on visuals, believing they drew more attention to a given story and away from Schottelkotte himself. The WCPO news staff had acquired a library of over 50,000 pieces of film footage and countless slides of noted personalities and local landmarks.
- By 1967, Schottelkotte was promoted to general manager of Scripps Howard's fledgling news division. Under his management, WCPO operated the Newsbird, one of the first news helicopters in the U.S.
- Schottelkotte was credited with the creation or co-creation of several local programs, both news and non-news oriented.

Eric Land, a longtime reporter at WCPO, later said that he modeled the fast-paced format at WIAT in Birmingham, Alabama, on Schottelkotte's newscasts when he became the station's general manager.

=== Notable appearances ===
Schottelkotte became so popular that he appeared in Gunsmoke as a bailiff in the episode "Old Man", which aired October 10, 1964, and also made a cameo radio broadcast as himself (even mentioning WCPO's call letters) in the January 6, 1966 "Not Guilty" episode of Gilligan's Island.

In 1973, when the Rembrandt painting "Portrait of an Old Woman" was stolen from the Taft Museum, a local man having found the painting called Schottelkotte personally and produced the portrait to him live on an 11 o'clock newscast; the painting was confirmed to be genuine by then-museum committee chairman John Warrington.

In May 1976, Schottelkotte interviewed President Gerald R. Ford at the White House.

During a 1977 newscast, an intruder barged into the studio shouting as Schottelkotte began narrating a film report. He punched the prowler with one hand while muting his microphone with the other so viewers could not hear it. The intruder fled and Schottelkotte, unperturbed, continued with the newscast.

In the early morning of October 15, 1980, WCPO and most of its news staff became part of a major news story when gunman James Hoskins seized control of WCPO's newsroom taking nine hostages including reporter Elaine Green and her cameraman. During a taped interview with Green, Hoskins stated he and his girlfriend (whom he admitted to killing right before seizing the newsroom) planned to cause deadly chaos in Cincinnati. After voicing his displeasure with local authority, Hoskins agreed to let the hostages go, and the eight-hour standoff ended when Hoskins killed himself while on the phone with SWAT negotiators. Schottelkotte ran special newscasts from WCPO's parking lot throughout the morning.

==== Other ====
In 1983 Schottelkotte made an unusual cameo in Dan Barr's music video, "Bus Full of Nuns" lip-synching the chorus while sitting at a nondescript anchor desk.

== Awards and honors ==
- February 1971 – Became vice president of news for Scripps Howard Broadcasting (the youngest vice president in Scripps-Howard history)
- May 1977 – Recipient of the Governor's Award For Career Achievement by the regional chapter of the National Academy of Television Arts and Sciences
- October 1981 – Promoted to senior vice president of Scripps Howard Broadcasting
- August 1982 – Named station manager of WCPO-TV
- June 1990 – Selected as one of five charter members of the Cincinnati Journalism Hall of Fame, Cincinnati chapter of the Society of Professional Journalists
- December 1985 – Named Scripps Howard Foundation president
- December 1996 – Named chairman of the Scripps Howard Foundation (three weeks before his death).

== Later years ==
In June 1982, after being unseated by WKRC as the number one newscast in Cincinnati, Schottelkotte announced that he would step down as anchor of the 11 p.m. news. He continued as anchor for the 6 p.m. news for four more years before anchoring his final newscast in August 1986. He continued doing the Spotlight Report until 1994.

== Personal life ==
Born in the Cincinnati suburb of Cheviot to Dutch parents, Schottelkotte was reared in the Roman Catholic faith. He married his first wife, Virginia Gleason, in July 1951 and had 12 children, six sons and six daughters. The marriage ended in divorce.

His second wife, one-time WCPO reporter Elaine Green, won a Peabody award in 1981 for her interview with gunman James Hoskins during the October 1980 hostage situation in WCPO's newsroom. By this marriage, Schottelkotte had two stepchildren.

== Death ==
Schottelkotte died of cancer on December 25, 1996, aged 69, at his Lawrenceburg, Indiana home. He was survived by his 12 children and two stepchildren, as well as his first and second wives, and several other relatives.
