= Glenn Ryle =

American television personality (1927–1993)

- _{Glenn Ryle in early 1980s promotional photo}
- Born: Glenn Ryle Schnitker; January 16, 1927; Cincinnati, Ohio
- Died: September 19, 1993 (aged 66); Cincinnati, Ohio
- Occupations: Announcer; Children's show host (Skipper Ryle); News/sports/weather reporter Game show emcee (Bowling For Dollars)
- Spouse: Jacqueline A. Stehr (m. 11 Aug. 1949)
- Children: Steve, Cheri

Glenn Ryle Schnitker (1927–1993) was an American television personality based in Cincinnati, Ohio. He is best remembered by Cincinnatians for hosting the Skipper Ryle Show for seventeen years on WKRC Television.

== Early life ==
Ryle attended Western Hills High School in Cincinnati during World War II. A member of the class of 1945, he became a member of the second of five chapters of the Cincinnati-based Fraternity Triginta Optimi. At age 17, Ryle left school to enter military service with the United States Marines. At one point in his service career he briefly participated in a War Bond drive with war hero Pappy Boyington.

Following his discharge, Ryle was a civilian advisor for the Israeli military in the Middle East during the time when this territory was being created. In June 1950 Ryle was recalled to active duty with the start of hostilities in the Korean War. He served in Korea just over a year.

== Radio and television career ==
On advice from a friend in Huntington, WV and against his own better judgment and with no prior experience or training, Ryle became involved in broadcasting and joined WMOH radio in Hamilton. His inexperience, and also his potential, caught the attention of Cecil Hale of the Cincinnati College-Conservatory of Music, who took Ryle under his wing, improving his skills. Ryle was later hired briefly by WLWT; his first on-camera commercial was on Midwestern Hayride plugging B.C. Headache Powders. His stint at WLWT was short-lived, and he continued at WMOH until he auditioned for and won a staff announcer position at WCPO-TV, where he performed additional duties including hosting a short-lived kids show (on this show he was a localized version of Captain Midnight); he also hosted a late night movie show, cleaned pianos, and even ran a boom microphone on Paul Dixon's pantomime show. Ryle was released from WCPO after a year and a half, and soon went to work as a writer/producer for the Ralph Jones Advertising Agency. In the fall of 1954 Ryle received a phone call from Paul Shoemaker at WKRC-TV offering Ryle another television job, which he immediately accepted.

At WKRC, Ryle reprised most of the duties he had at WCPO—staff announcing and hosting a movie matinee show. A year after hiring on at WKRC he co-created and hosted The Skipper Ryle Show and in the 70s hosted the local weeknight version of Bowling for Dollars. Early in his career Ryle was one of six staff announcers at Channel 12, but ultimately it was Ryle's voice that became synonymous with WKRC, especially its Station IDs and promos; Ryle remained at WKRC for 35 years.

== Skipper Ryle ==
In the late winter-early spring of 1956, Ryle was chosen by WKRC executives to host a children's show consisting mostly of cartoons; the show was initially going to be called Hi, Kids!, but then Ryle's military experience asserted itself, and when he started adding messages about river and boat safety, the producers decided to go with a riverboat setting which, with Cincinnati being right on the Ohio River, was a perfect fit. Then someone suggested the nickname "Skipper", which Ryle liked, and thus the name of the show was changed.

In the show's earlier years, Ryle donned a Naval peacoat and matching peaked cap with a gray wig and bushy mustache, adopting an "old man of the sea" motif, but by the early 60s the wig had been discarded and Ryle had grown a real mustache of his own. The rousing seafaring song "Blow High, Blow Low" from the Rodgers & Hammerstein musical Carousel was used as the show's theme.

The Skipper Ryle Show became a surprise hit and ultimately ran seventeen years on WKRC. Originally an hour-long Saturday morning show, it later moved to Sundays for two hours, and later still became a weekday series. At its peak the show was second only to WCPO's Uncle Al Show in popularity among kids. Part of the show's larger appeal was that Ryle was never condescending in his talks with the kids who appeared on the show. Despite the fact that his own personal primary demographic was kids who had felt they had outgrown Uncle Al, Ryle tried to, as he once put it, "open the whole thing up to everybody", young and old alike. Colleague Nick Clooney and other local critics once regarded Skipper Ryle as the most civilized children's show on television.

The show became so popular that Ryle made in-person appearances at local amusement parks including Coney Island, LeSourdsville Lake, and even at the Cincinnati Zoo. In the early 70s, Ryle, in an attempt to compete with rival WXIX's Sunday morning powerhouse Wonderama, hosted a limited-run weekend series called the Skipper Ryle Special which featured a live audience, games and guest stars; over the years Ryle gave away countless prizes from Cincinnati-based Kenner Toys. But by 1973, though the show was still very popular, WKRC executives, citing increasing expense, decided to cancel production of the show.

== Personal life ==
The Ryles lived in the western Cincinnati suburb of Cheviot. Ryle's wife, Jacqueline, was a Cincinnati native; they had two children, Steve and Cheri Schnitker. Ryle maintained a low profile after his retirement in the late 80s. His final public appearance was an interview by colleague and long-time friend Nick Clooney at WCET in the fall of 1990. He died in 1993 and was buried in Bridgetown Cemetery in Cheviot.
