= Elaine Green =

American television journalist (1940–2014)

L. Elaine Green
- Born: November 5, 1940; Bethel, Ohio, U.S.
- Died: May 5, 2014 (aged 73)
- Other names: Elaine Green; Elaine Schottelkotte
- Occupation: Television news reporter

L. Elaine Green (née Browning; November 5, 1940 – May 5, 2014) was an American TV reporter who worked for WCPO-TV for 14 years (1969–83).

== Career ==
Green worked as a model on the Mike Douglas Show in Cleveland before moving to work at WCPO after being hired in 1969 by future husband Al Schottelkotte to be a fashion reporter. She was then trained to be a news journalist by Schottelkotte.

She won the Peabody award in 1981 for her 1980 interview conducted while being held hostage along with others by James Hoskins for 12 hours in the headquarters of the TV station on October 15, 1980. Hoskins had forced his way into the newsroom and took nine hostages before killing himself while he sat in the news reporters chair.

After her career with WCPO she founded her own video production business, Video Features, in 1982.

== Personal life ==
Born in Bethel, Ohio to Charles and Ruth Browning, she graduated from Bethel Tate High School in 1958.

She wed WCPO news director Al Schottelkotte (1927–1996) in January 1988. She was his second wife. The couple had two children, David and Tracey. Prior to her death Green lived in Lawrenceburg, Indiana.

== Death ==
Green died on May 5, 2014, aged 73, from complications during routine surgery. She was survived by two children and four grandchildren.
