= Len Mink =

American evangelist and musician

Len Mink (3 June 1947 — 28 November 2023) was a Christian evangelist and musician. He was the president and founder of Len Mink Ministries, based in Tulsa, Oklahoma. He and his late wife Cathy had a weekly television program entitled Len and Cathy on the TCT television network, which was carried in 173 countries on Sky Angel channel 133 and DirecTV channel 377.

A singer and songwriter of Christian music, Mink was the worship leader for evangelist Kenneth Copeland in his Believers Conventions for 35 years. Mink is also known for his "Gospel Duck" ministry for children.

Mink began his television career with his own weekly show on WCPO-TV in Cincinnati, Ohio. Mink was also a featured performer on The Nick Clooney Show and was a featured performer in pops concerts with the Cincinnati Symphony Orchestra. He made appearances on The Tonight Show Starring Johnny Carson, The Mike Douglas Show, The Steve Allen Show and The Merv Griffin Show.

In 1971, Mink became a committed Christian. Around the same time, he was diagnosed with a terminal blood disease; he states that he read Kathryn Kuhlman’s book I Believe in Miracles and was healed. Subsequently, Mink appeared on many Christian television productions: The 700 Club, The Kathryn Kuhlman Show, Help Line, Turning Point, 100 Huntley Street, PTL, TBN, The Believer's Voice of Victory and many more.

Cathy Mink graduated from Ohio State University and worked as fashion model in New York City. Unhappy with this career, she returned to her hometown of Cincinnati and began work at a local television station. She met Len and became a committed Christian; they married and began their joint ministry. Cathy was a graduate of Rhema Bible Training Center, and names Kenneth Hagin as a major influence.

Len Mink died 28 November 2023 at the age of 76.
