= Wal-Lex Recreation Center =

Entertainment complex in Waltham, Massachusetts

Coordinates: 42.4030°N 71.2345°W

The Wal-Lex Recreation Center, or simply Wal-Lex, was an entertainment complex located in Waltham, Massachusetts, which operated from 1947 until 2002. Considered a landmark in Waltham and the surrounding area, Wal-Lex consisted of a 60-lane candlepin bowling facility, a rollerskating rink, billiard tables, and video games. It also featured mini-golf until 1985.

The name is a portmanteau of Waltham and Lexington, as the facility was located on Lexington Street in Waltham, not far from the town line where the road became Waltham Street in Lexington.

== History ==
Wal-Lex, the brainchild of John Rando, Fred Tortola Sr., Thomas Cappadona, and George Rando, first opened its facilities on July 4, 1947, and at the time consisted only of a twenty-lane candlepin bowling alley.

During the 1950s and 60s, the Wal-Lex became increasingly popular, necessitating the addition of an eighteen lane annex building in 1954 and the addition of a twenty-two-lane second floor in 1960. The complex was a major attraction in the Greater Boston area and became a popular spot for celebrities heading into Boston as well as professional bowlers.

In 1950, a roller-skating rink was constructed next door to the bowling alley, which featured skate rentals, a snack bar, and a live organ player. At one point, the facility also included a mini-golf course, kiddie rides, and a dairy stand.

At the time of its closure, the facility was showing its age. The original pinsetters were still operational (although, at first, the pins were set manually by pinboys), and scores were still being taken by paper and pencil. The wooden lanes had been sanded down to the nails. Still a popular attraction for youths and bowling leagues, the Wal-Lex did not shut its doors due to lack of business, but rather because the facility had simply become a victim of its own age.

On the spot once occupied by the mini-golf course now sits a Burger King restaurant which opened in 1986. The rest of the facility remained operational until it was closed and demolished in 2002. The former site of Wal-Lex now houses a CVS and a Staples store.

The Wal-Lex bowling alley was the filming site for the television show Candlepins for Cash after the show moved to WXNE-TV Channel 25 in 1982.
