= Sasha Rionda =

Mexican actress and television hostess

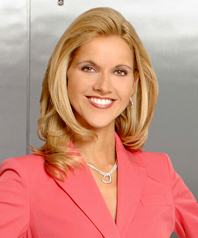
Sasha Rionda

Sasha Sybille Rionda Hogger (born September 29, 1977, in Mexico City, Mexico) is a Mexican actress and television hostess.

As a child actress, she is most probably remembered as the mutant child psychic who correctly guesses the birthday of Arnold Schwarzenegger's character Quaid in the 1990 sci-fi film Total Recall.

Rionda currently resides in Atlanta, Georgia. She is the on air anchor of Local Now conducting national news and entertainment segments and providing occasional field reports.

She participates in the weekly show Coffee with America, which offers news and reporting on social media and pop culture.

Previously she hosted Detalles con Sasha on CNN Español. She was also the anchor and reporter of a Spanish-language news program named Nuestro Rincón on WKRC-TV, aimed at the hispanic community of Cincinnati, Ohio, where she resided from 2004 to 2008. She also was host of Cinecanal's "Zoom". Back in 2001, she hosted a program named The Music Room for CNN International.

== Selected filmography ==
- Total Recall (1990) – Mutant child
- Wild On! – hosted installment Wild On the Beach Australia
- The Devil to Pay (2002)
- Coffee with America (2015 – present) – host
