= Channel 25 virtual TV stations in the United States =

Television stations

The following television stations operate on virtual channel 25 in the United States:

- K07AAF-D in Corsicana, Texas
- K16IR-D in Sayre, Oklahoma
- K17MK-D in Elk City, Oklahoma
- K23NH-D in Seiling, Oklahoma
- K25AD-D in Victorville, etc., California
- K25FP-D in Ellensburg, Washington
- K25GA-D in Redmond/Prineville, Oregon
- K25GK-D in Joshua Tree, California
- K25II-D in Redwood Falls, Minnesota
- K25KZ-D in Kalispell, Montana
- K25LG-D in Tyler, Texas
- K25LM-D in Great Falls, Montana
- K25LO-D in Hamilton, Montana
- K25LY-D in Fargo, North Dakota
- K25NG-D in St. Louis, Missouri
- K25QL-D in Chico, California
- K25QM-D in Palm Springs, California
- K26ND-D in Hollis, Oklahoma
- K27OJ-D in El Paso, Texas
- K28KI-D in Roseburg, Oregon
- K33NV-D in Strong City, Oklahoma
- KAUN-LD in Sioux Falls, South Dakota
- KAVU-TV in Victoria, Texas
- KCKS-LD in Kansas City, Kansas
- KCKW-LD in Eugene, Oregon
- KCTL-LD in Livingston, Texas
- KDEN-TV in Longmont, Colorado
- KFDR in Jefferson City, Missouri
- KFLL-LD in Boise, Idaho
- KGCT-CD in Nowata, Oklahoma
- KHDE-LD in Laramie, Wyoming
- KJNK-LD in Minneapolis, Minnesota
- KJPO-LD in Parker, Arizona
- KKRA-LD in Rapid City, South Dakota
- KLFA-LD in Santa Maria, California
- KLGC-LD in Alexandria, Louisiana
- KLPA-TV in Alexandria, Louisiana
- KMDE in Devils Lake, North Dakota
- KMJC-LD in Louisburg, Kansas
- KNDU in Richland, Washington
- KNET-CD in Los Angeles, California
- KOKH-TV in Oklahoma City, Oklahoma
- KPVM-LD in Las Vegas / Pahrump, Nevada
- KQDF-LD in Santa Fe, New Mexico
- KQET in Watsonville, California
- KQMK-LD in Lincoln, Nebraska
- KRRI-LD in Reno, Nevada
- KSVN-CD in Ogden, Utah
- KTEL-TV in Carlsbad, New Mexico
- KUTU-CD in Tulsa, Oklahoma
- KVTN-DT in Pine Bluff, Arkansas
- KXCO-LD in Refugio, Texas
- KXXV in Waco, Texas
- W19EY-D in Toa Baja, Puerto Rico
- W25DQ-D in Key West, Florida
- W25FQ-D in Florence, South Carolina
- W25FR-D in Clarksburg, West Virginia
- W25FS-D in Clarksburg, West Virginia
- W25FT-D in Baraboo, Wisconsin
- W25FX-D in Sutton, West Virginia
- W26DK-D in San Juan, Puerto Rico
- W31EZ-D in Chicago, Illinois
- W32FD-D in Louisa, Kentucky
- W34FP-D in Eastlake, Ohio
- WACS-TV in Dawson, Georgia
- WBQC-LD in Cincinnati, Ohio
- WCPX-LD in Columbus, Ohio
- WCWW-LD in South Bend, Indiana
- WDMC-LD in Charlotte, North Carolina
- WDVM-TV in Hagerstown, Maryland
- WEDK-LD in Effingham, Illinois
- WEEK-TV in Peoria, Illinois
- WEHT in Evansville, Indiana
- WEYI-TV in Saginaw, Michigan
- WFXT in Boston, Massachusetts
- WHIQ in Huntsville, Alabama
- WJMY-CD in Tuscaloosa, Alabama
- WJXX in Orange Park, Florida
- WKAS in Ashland, Kentucky
- WKUT-LD in Bowling Green, Kentucky
- WLAX in La Crosse, Wisconsin
- WLMS-LD in Columbus, Mississippi
- WNYE-TV in New York, New York
- WOGC-CD in Holland, Michigan
- WOLO-TV in Columbia, South Carolina
- WPBF in Tequesta, Florida
- WPDP-CD in Cleveland, Tennessee
- WPHY-CD in Trenton, New Jersey
- WROB-LD in Topeka, Kansas
- WQIX-LD in Vidalia, Georgia
- WUNK-TV in Greenville, North Carolina
- WUSP-LD in Ponce, Puerto Rico
- WVAD-LD in Chesapeake, Virginia
- WVBG-LD in Greenwich, New York
- WVIZ in Cleveland, Ohio
- WXXV-TV in Gulfport, Mississippi

The following television stations, which are no longer licensed, formerly operated on virtual channel 25:

- K17LX-D in Bakersfield, California
- K25HD-D in Bullhead City, Arizona
- K25ND-D in Mount Vernon, Texas
- KLDT-LD in Lufkin, Texas
- KTUD-CD in Las Vegas, Nevada
