= WFXT =

Television station in Boston

- Boston, Massachusetts; United States
- Channels: Digital: 34 (UHF); Virtual: 25
- Branding: Boston 25

Programming
- Affiliations: 25.1: Fox; for others, see § Subchannels

Ownership
- Owner: Cox Media Group; (WFXT (Boston), LLC)

History
- Founded: June 1972
- First air date: October 10, 1977
- Former call signs: WXNE-TV (1977–1987)
- Former channel numbers: Analog: 25 (UHF, 1977–2009); Digital: 31 (UHF, 1999–2019)
- Former affiliations: Independent (1977–1987)
- Call sign meaning: Fox Television (former owner and current affiliation)

Technical information
- Licensing authority: FCC
- Facility ID: 6463
- ERP: 1,000 kW
- HAAT: 350 m (1,148 ft)
- Transmitter coordinates: 42°18′10.7″N 71°13′4.9″W

Links
- Public license information: Public file; LMS
- Website: www.boston25news.com

WFXT (channel 25) is a television station in Boston, Massachusetts, United States, affiliated with the Fox network and owned by Cox Media Group. Its studios are located on Fox Drive (near the Boston-Providence Turnpike) in Dedham, and its transmitter is located on Cabot Street in Needham. WFXT is the largest Fox affiliate by market size that is not owned and operated by the network, although it was previously owned by Fox on two occasions (1987–1990 and 1995–2014).

== History ==
=== Early years (1977–1986) ===
The station first signed on the air on October 10, 1977, as WXNE-TV (standing for "Christ (X) in New England"); originally operating as an independent station, it was founded by the then–Portsmouth, Virginia–based Christian Broadcasting Network. After being awarded a construction permit to build the station from the Federal Communications Commission (FCC) in June 1972, CBN targeted the new channel 25 to begin operations within one year. However, various delays in obtaining both a studio and transmitter location resulted in a wait of over five years for the station to finally sign-on. WXNE-TV's early programming format was targeted at a family audience, consisting of older syndicated reruns and a decent amount of religious programming—including CBN's flagship show, The 700 Club, hosted by the ministry's founder Pat Robertson. Religious programs ran for about six hours a day during the week, and throughout the day on Sundays. The station also carried the daily and Sunday Mass from the Boston Catholic Television Center. Secular programming consisted of westerns, older movies, family-oriented drama series, old film shorts, and classic television series. For several years under CBN ownership, Tim Robertson served as the station's program director, appointed by his father, Pat Robertson.

The station began adding more cartoons, made-for-TV movies, and off-network sitcoms and family dramas during the early 1980s. Most notably, in 1980, WXNE took over production of the weekday bowling program Candlepins for Cash, which had just been canceled by CBS affiliate WNAC-TV (channel 7, now WHDH) after seven seasons. With new host Rico Petrocelli, the show moved production from WNAC-TV's studios, in bowling lanes that were built in the basement of the facility, to the now-defunct Wal-Lex Lanes in Waltham. After only a few months as host, Petrocelli was ousted in favor of the program's original host when it aired on WNAC-TV, Bob Gamere, who remained on Candlepins until it ended its run on channel 25 in 1983. During this time, the station rebranded itself as "Boston 25", as it converted into a true independent. While the station was carried only on cable providers in the Greater Boston market, WXNE-TV held a solid third place among the area's independent stations, behind the longer-established WSBK-TV (channel 38) and WLVI-TV (channel 56), and sixth in the ratings among the market's commercial television stations.

In April 1986, WXNE and the other two CBN-owned stations—KXTX-TV in Dallas and WYAH-TV in Portsmouth—were put up for sale. That August, News Corporation announced that it would purchase channel 25, with plans to make it an owned-and-operated station of its Fox Broadcasting Company. Fox had been in preliminary negotiations to secure an affiliation with either WSBK or WLVI, but ended its pursuit of both outlets. Until the sale was completed, channel 25, upon the Fox network's startup on October 9, 1986, did not air the network's inaugural program and what was then its lone offering, The Late Show Starring Joan Rivers, a late-night talk show that aired opposite The Tonight Show Starring Johnny Carson on NBC. The outgoing CBN ownership believed that the program did not fit its strict content guidelines. Fox instead contracted Boston radio station WMRE (1510 AM, now WMEX) to carry the audio portion of The Late Show in the interim.

=== As WFXT (1987–present) ===
When the sale to News Corporation was completed on December 31, 1986, WXNE-TV, renamed WFXT on January 19, 1987, became the seventh Fox-owned property and the first to be acquired separately from News Corporation's 1986 purchase of Metromedia's six television stations that served as the foundation for the new network. Besides adding The Late Show to the schedule, airings of The 700 Club were cut to once a day, and the daily broadcast of the Roman Catholic Mass was moved to an earlier timeslot. The station also began airing the syndicated, Fox-produced tabloid magazine A Current Affair on weeknights; WFXT was the second station, after producing station and Fox flagship WNYW in New York City, to air the program. WXNE staff announcer Chris Clausen had already been let go in late 1986 (promptly joining WNEV-TV in January 1987) in favor of the services of Fox affiliate voiceover Beau Weaver, who would remain with both the station and Fox Television Stations for over a decade. The station's schedule, however, was largely unchanged at the outset, aside from the removal of several older sitcoms that soon resurfaced on WQTV (channel 68, now WBPX-TV). The Sunday evening religious program block was finally discontinued on April 5, 1987, when Fox launched its prime time lineup, which initially aired only on Sundays before expanding to Saturdays that July (as such, WFXT is the only Boston television station that has never changed its network affiliation, as it has been with Fox since the network's prime time expansion; it wasn't until 1993 that Fox had programming on all seven days of the week).

Over the next few years, WFXT, for the most part was unable to acquire the better syndicated programs and continued to only acquire shows that WSBK, WLVI, and the market's network affiliates passed on. In addition to Fox programming, most of the shows added to WFXT's schedule were low-budget, first-run syndicated programs and cartoons. However, in 1988, the station did manage to buy two popular weekday syndicated shows away from WNEV—Hollywood Squares (the then-current John Davidson version) and Entertainment Tonight—when the CBS affiliate phased them off its schedule, due to other programming commitments. WFXT aired Squares through its 1989 cancellation; it carried ET weeknights at 7 p.m., as the lead-in to A Current Affair, until selling the show back to WHDH-TV (the former WNEV) in 1990. WFXT has again aired ET since 2015.

==== Sale to the Boston Celtics ====
As the FCC prohibited the common ownership of a television station and a newspaper in the same market, in purchasing channel 25, News Corporation had to apply for and was granted a temporary waiver in order to retain WFXT and the newspaper it had also published, the Boston Herald. On April 21, 1988, Rupert Murdoch, who had earlier stated his intention to retain the Herald, announced that WFXT would be put up for sale. In 1989, Fox proposed placing WFXT in a trust company as it sought to find a buyer willing to meet its $35 million asking price; on April 26, the FCC ruled that the trust would be required to sever all of the station's ties to Fox, including the network affiliation. That September, Fox agreed to sell the station to the Boston Celtics' ownership group for $20 million; the sale was completed on May 11, 1990. As part of the deal, News Corporation was given the opportunity to eventually buy back a 37.5-percent stake in the station. The Celtics made WFXT the NBA team's flagship station starting with the 1990–91 season, following the expiration of its existing contract with WLVI-TV. The station also gained a radio sister station, as the Celtics also purchased WEEI (then at 590 AM, now WEZE; now at 850 AM) at the same time.

The Celtics did not have the financial means to compete as a broadcaster. Nonetheless, under Celtics ownership, WFXT finally began to acquire stronger programming, becoming a serious competitor to WSBK and WLVI for the first time. In 1990, among securing the rights to several new, high-profile rerun syndication packages, WFXT managed to buy rights to The Cosby Show, reruns of which had been airing on WCVB-TV (channel 5) for the past two years. WCVB, which had lost a lot of money airing The Cosby Show in weekend blocks only, retained a small portion of the show's syndication rights for weekends and occasional airings in prime time (in the event that they chose to preempt an ABC network program). WFXT, meanwhile, began airing Cosby Show reruns on weekdays in the fall of 1990; aside from a couple of years off between 1994 and 1996, The Cosby Show would remain a staple of WFXT's schedule for well over a decade.

==== Return to Fox ownership ====
By 1992, WFXT was carried on many cable providers in areas of New England where there was no locally-based Fox affiliate station. Locally, however, the station was still rated in third place (though not as distant as the CBN or early Fox days), behind WSBK and WLVI. Still, for a while under the Celtics' watch, WFXT was perceived to be in danger of losing its Fox affiliation. As early as March 1993, Fox was again considering the purchase of a Boston television station, even though News Corporation still owned the Boston Herald, and entered into preliminary discussions with Boston Celtics Communications about reacquiring WFXT; the Celtics subsequently said, in a filing with the Securities and Exchange Commission (SEC), that Fox had warned the company that it could pull its affiliation from the station if it were to acquire another property in the market. By this point, Fox held a 25-percent convertible interest in WFXT, and indicated it was seeking to expand this interest. That October, Fox obtained a 10-year option to repurchase the station as early as 1995, and immediately announced that it would not seek a waiver to own both channel 25 and the Herald; News Corporation sold the newspaper to its publisher, Pat Purcell, in February 1994, clearing the way for a potential purchase of WFXT. The Celtics also moved their games off their own station, shifting the team's over-the-air broadcast rights to WSBK-TV in a five-year deal that began with the 1993–94 season; this move followed WFXT's increasing difficulty in scheduling Celtics telecasts around the Fox lineup.

WFXT's Fox affiliation again came into question in 1994, in the wake of the network's affiliation deal with twelve New World Communications stations, when reports emerged that then-CBS affiliate WHDH-TV was considering a switch to Fox. After Westinghouse Broadcasting signed a deal that July to affiliate all of its stations, including WBZ-TV (channel 4), with CBS, WHDH was given the opportunity to choose between Fox and the NBC affiliation being vacated by WBZ; it elected to sign with NBC in August 1994, keeping Fox on WFXT. On October 5, 1994, Fox announced it would exercise its purchase option and buy WFXT. That November, the deal, as well as Fox's concurrent purchase of WTXF in Philadelphia, encountered objections from NBC, alleging that Fox's interest in SF Broadcasting, in connection with the Boston and Philadelphia purchases, would put Fox over the FCC's 12-station ownership limit; NBC subsequently filed a separate petition concerning Fox's ties to the then-Australian-based News Corporation. NBC withdrew its petitions on February 17, 1995, allowing Fox to retake control of channel 25 on July 7.

As the 1990s progressed, WFXT began phasing in more talk and reality programs. It continued running cartoons (including the Fox Kids block) each weekday—later becoming the last station in the market that had run a morning children's program block—and sitcoms during the evening hours. WFXT served as the television flagship of the Boston Red Sox for three seasons from 2000 to 2002 (before that and since then, WFXT only carried Red Sox games that were televised by Fox itself, including games from its four World Series victories in 2004, 2007, 2013, and 2018).

In the fall of 2001, WPXT (which served as the over-the-air Fox affiliate for the Portland area since the network launched) disaffiliated from Fox due to a payment dispute between Pegasus Broadcasting (the station's owner at the time) and the network. This left Portland and the entire state of Maine without a Fox affiliate until then-Pax TV affiliate WMPX-TV switched to the network in April 2003; during this time, WFXT served as the default Fox affiliate for the New Hampshire side of the Portland market, while Foxnet provided the network's programming throughout Maine.

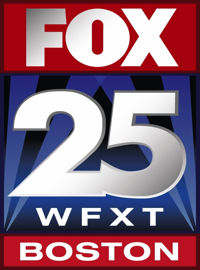
WFXT's logo from July 2006 to October 26, 2015, using a logo format also used at other Fox-owned television stations. The "25" in this logo had been used from September 22, 1997, to October 26, 2015.

At one point in 2006, the station was "tentatively planning" to carry programming from News Corporation-owned MyNetworkTV (a sister network to Fox) on weekdays from 1 to 3 p.m. if the new network was unable to find an affiliate in the Boston market. On July 21, 2006, News Corporation announced that Derry, New Hampshire–based WZMY-TV (channel 50, now WWJE-DT) would become the market's MyNetworkTV affiliate when the network began operations on September 5, 2006. Channel 50 ended its affiliation with MyNetworkTV in September 2011, shortly after changing call letters to WBIN-TV; WSBK (a CBS-owned sister station to WBZ-TV that had shunned the network at its formation) took over the affiliation at that time. Before MyNetworkTV became a programming service consisting solely of reruns, WFXT occasionally promoted that network's programming.

On October 12, 2007, Comcast began blacking out Fox prime time and sports programming from WFXT on its systems in Bristol County due to an invocation of the FCC's network non-duplication rule by WNAC-TV, the Fox affiliate in Providence, Rhode Island, leaving only channel 25's syndicated programs and newscasts available in that area. On July 31, 2008, Charter Communications' system in Westport also became subject to the blackouts, this contributed to WFXT's eventual removal from that system on September 23, 2008.

==== Trade to Cox Media Group ====
On June 24, 2014, Fox announced that it would trade WFXT and Memphis sister station WHBQ-TV to the Cox Media Group, in exchange for the San Francisco duopoly of Fox affiliate KTVU and independent station KICU-TV. The trade was completed on October 8, 2014. Following this deal, CBS-owned WBZ-TV and Telemundo-owned WNEU briefly became the only network O&O stations in the Boston area (prior to the launch of NBC Boston in January 2017), and also made WFXT the largest Fox affiliate not owned by the network (prior to the completion of the swap, KTVU held that title). In November 2014, shortly after the closure of the sale, WFXT was briefly pulled from Verizon FiOS in the Boston area for a week due to a discrepancy in contract negotiations.

WFXT's final "Fox 25" logo, used from October 27, 2015, to February 2018. The subsequent "Boston 25" logos are based on this logo.

On October 27, 2015, WFXT dropped the Fox O&O-style branding and introduced a new logo and on-air appearance; the logo was criticized by some viewers for its simplified appearance—omitting the standard Fox network logo in favor of an italicized Helvetica logotype—and received national attention when Larry Potash, anchor of the Morning News on WGN-TV in Chicago, criticized the change as a move by station-hired consultants to help bring in viewers who defected from WFXT's newscasts following the departure of longtime evening anchor Maria Stephanos earlier that year (Stephanos would join WCVB-TV in 2016). Prior to Super Bowl LI in February 2017, the station began downplaying the Fox name from its overall branding; this was reflected in a promo that aired prior to and during the game (which itself used the same music, tagline, and overall format as a 2014 image promotion made by Australia's Seven Network) that referred to the news operation as "25 News".

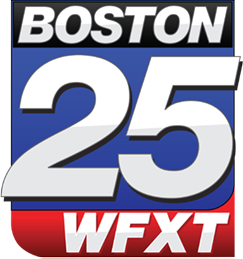
WFXT's first "Boston 25" logo, used from April 24, 2017 (initially alongside the "Fox 25" logo), until 2019

On April 13, 2017, the station announced that it would rebrand its newscasts as Boston 25 News on April 24, 2017; from then on, the "Fox 25" branding was retained as a generalized identity restricted to WFXT's entertainment programming and station promotions (the move followed a similar split branding structure that Cox Media Group employed when it operated KTVU as a Fox affiliate between 1986 and 2014, in which references to the Fox network were omitted from use within that station's local news programs). General manager Tom Raponi told The Boston Globe that the change was made to eliminate a perception that WFXT's newscasts leaned conservative, which the station attributed to an internal survey taken in 2015 in which 41% of Boston area news viewers that were polled associated its newscasts with the national Fox News Channel, rather than its sister broadcast network (as an affiliate of the Fox Broadcasting Company, WFXT's only association with Fox News is through a compulsory content arrangement with Fox News Edge, which supplies national and international news footage, and reports from FNC correspondents to Fox stations for potential but not mandatory inclusion in their local newscasts). In February 2018, the station dropped the "Fox 25" branding entirely and began referring to itself as "Boston 25" full time, including in promotions for syndicated and Fox network programming, making WFXT one of only a handful of Fox affiliates that does not use "Fox" in its branding.

==== Sale to Apollo Global Management ====
In February 2019, it was announced that Apollo Global Management would acquire Cox Media Group and Northwest Broadcasting's stations. Although the group planned to operate under the name Terrier Media, it was later announced in June 2019 that Apollo would also acquire Cox's radio and advertising businesses, and retain the Cox Media Group name. The sale was completed on December 17, 2019.

==== Canceled sale to Standard General ====
On February 22, 2022, Cox announced that it would sell WFXT to an affiliate of Standard General, contingent on Standard General's acquisition of Tegna Inc., as well as Cox Media Group's acquisition of the four Standard Media television stations and Tegna-owned Texas stations WFAA and KMPX in Dallas–Fort Worth; KVUE in Austin; and KHOU and KTBU in Houston. The deal was canceled on May 22, 2023.

== Programming ==
=== Sports programming ===
Through the NFL on Fox, WFXT typically airs two New England Patriots games a year, usually when the team plays host to an NFC team at Gillette Stadium. However, the institution of the NFL's new 'cross-flex' rules in 2014 (in which Patriots games involving an AFC opponent are moved from WBZ-TV), along with Fox's broadcasting rights to Thursday Night Football starting in 2018, has given the station more opportunities to air regular season Patriots games. The station has aired five of the Patriots' Super Bowl appearances (XXXI, XXXVI, XXXIX, XLII and LI), including the team's championship victories (XXXVI, XXXIX, and LI).

The station also airs any Boston Red Sox games that are part of Fox's Major League Baseball telecasts. Owing to Fox's exclusive coverage of the World Series since 2000, WFXT has carried every Red Sox championship in the television era (2004, 2007, 2013, and 2018). It also served as the team's primary over-the-air broadcaster for three seasons from 2000 to 2002 as the flagship station of the "Fox 25 Red Sox Television Network". WFXT also carried a package of weekday afternoon Red Sox spring training games, produced by NESN, in 2018 and 2019. As mentioned above, it carried Celtics games under the team's ownership in the early 1990s.

When Fox held the NHL's U.S. over-the-air broadcast contract from 1995 to 1999, any games involving the Boston Bruins that were selected to air on the NHL on Fox were aired on WFXT.

On May 18, 2026, the New England Revolution announced that WFXT would carry eight Monday late night replays of the previous weekend's matches; live broadcasts of matches continue to be exclusive to Apple TV.

=== News operation ===
WFXT presently broadcasts 79 hours, 55 minutes of locally produced newscasts each week (with 14 hours, 35 minutes each weekday and 3 1/2 hours each on Saturdays and Sundays). During weather segments, the station utilizes live National Weather Service radar data originating from a radar site at the NWS Weather Forecast Office in Norton. It is currently the highest news input in the Boston market.

One of the few productive moves that WFXT made under the ownership of the Boston Celtics was entering into a news share agreement with regional cable news channel New England Cable News (NECN) to produce a prime time newscast at 10 p.m., which debuted on September 7, 1993. The half-hour Fox 25 News at 10 was initially anchored by Heather Kahn, with Tim Kelley on weather. Kahn lasted a year in this role before she was hired by ABC affiliate WCVB-TV (channel 5); Lila Orbach replaced her as anchor. In September 1994, NECN began to produce a half-hour midday newscast at 12:30 p.m. for channel 25, which was subsequently canceled.

In September 1995, WFXT announced that the contract with NECN would not be renewed, with the final broadcast airing on October 1. The next day, NECN moved the newscast to WSBK, which was more willing to commit to a longer-term deal with the channel, as channel 25 was planning to eventually replace the NECN production with its own news operation. For the next year, the only news programming on WFXT consisted primarily of national updates supplied by Fox News that aired during the day. During this time, Fox Television Stations created an in-house news department for the station, culminating on September 9, 1996, with the launch of a new 10 p.m. broadcast, initially branded as Fox News Boston before reviving the Fox 25 News title the following year. The 10 p.m. newscast has aired as an hour-long program since its inception, originally airing in the format on Monday through Saturday nights, while the Sunday edition aired for a half-hour in order to accommodate a sports highlight program, Sports Sunday on Fox; Sports Sunday ended its run on May 16, 2004, with the Sunday edition of the 10 p.m. newscast expanding to an hour the following week.

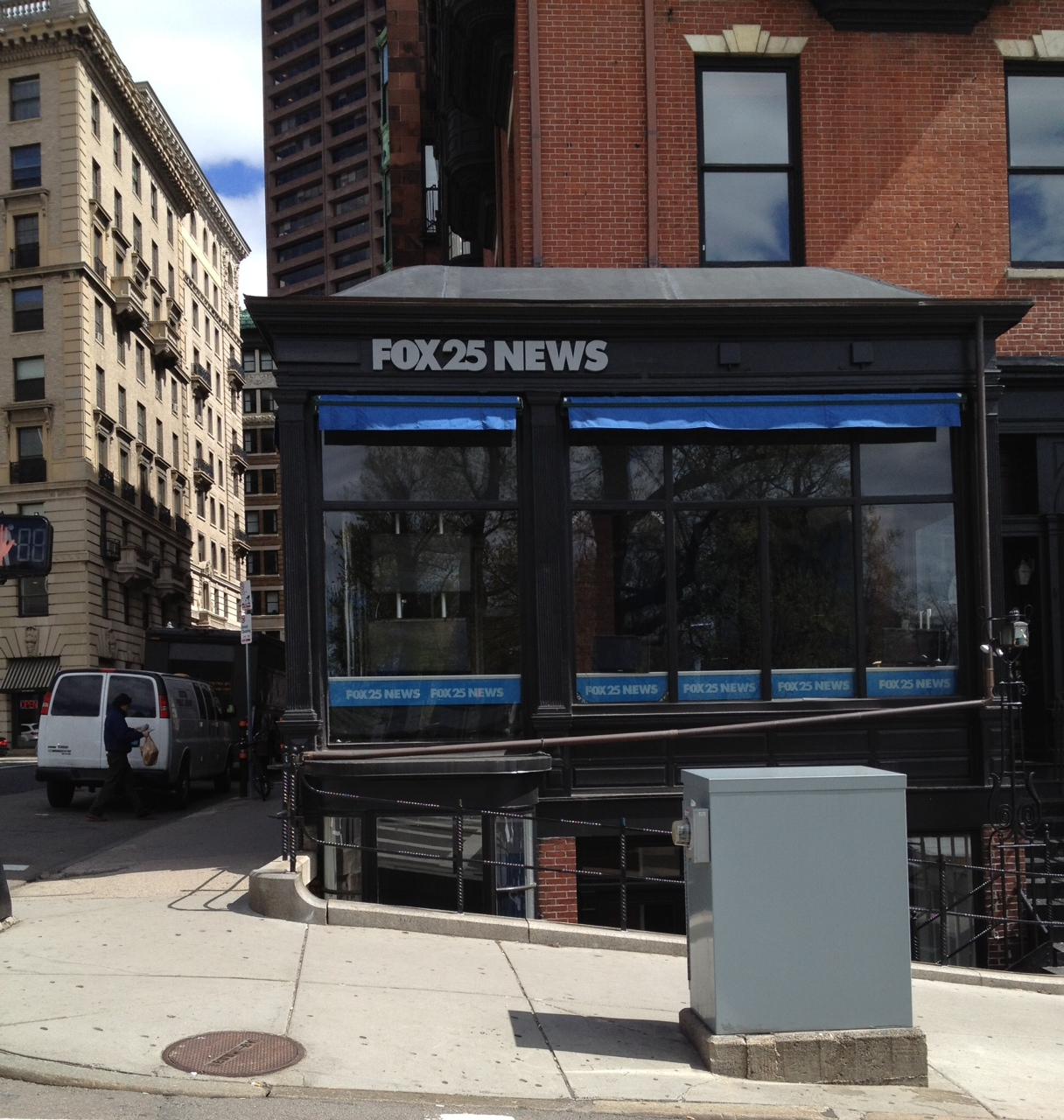
WFXT's former news bureau located near the Massachusetts State House in Boston.

Over the next decade, channel 25 gradually expanded its news operation. On June 4, 2001, WFXT added a 4:30 p.m. newscast (making it the first Fox-owned station to have produced a newscast during the 4 p.m. hour) that was anchored by Jodi Applegate and was targeted at a female audience. By September 2002, the program had moved to 5 p.m., and on September 22, 2003, it was expanded to an hour and began using the same anchors and a similar format as the 10 p.m. broadcast, as Applegate became co-anchor, along with former WHDH-TV sports director Gene Lavanchy, of a three-hour weekday morning newscast from 6 to 9 a.m. that launched the same day. One year later, Applegate left WFXT to become co-anchor of Good Day New York on then-sister station WNYW and was replaced by former WHDH and WBZ-TV anchor Kim Carrigan. Concurrent with the debut of the morning newscast, WFXT unveiled a 90,000 square feet (8,400 m^{2}) newsroom similar to that of WHDH, which also serves as the station's news set. Channel 25 also opened a news bureau on Beacon Hill near the State House in downtown Boston, which serves as an interview location for Massachusetts lawmakers as well as a home base for weekday morning commentator Doug "V. B." Goudie.

The station debuted an hour-long Sunday morning newscast at 9 a.m. on September 12, 2004; the program was canceled in July 2009. On May 19, 2009, WFXT and the CBS-owned duopoly of WBZ-TV/WSBK-TV entered into a Local News Service agreement, which allows the stations to share local news footage, along with a helicopter for traffic reports and breaking news. The helicopter originally used as part of the sharing agreement (which WFXT and WBZ/WSBK stopped using in 2013) was involved in a crash that killed two people in Seattle on March 18, 2014, while on loan by Helicopters, Inc. for use by KOMO-TV during technical upgrades to that station's own helicopter. On June 14, 2009, starting with its 10 p.m. newscast, WFXT became the last station in the Boston market at the time to begin broadcasting its newscasts in high definition (NBC owned-and-operated station WBTS-LD signed on in HD on January 1, 2017).

WFXT launched a Sunday through Friday 11 p.m. newscast on November 5, 2007; the weekday morning newscast has also expanded since its launch, and has aired from 4 to 10 a.m. since July 9, 2012. The 5 p.m. newscast, which consistently placed fourth in its timeslot, was discontinued in favor of a half-hour 6 p.m. newscast on September 14, 2009. That program was expanded to one hour with the launch of an additional half-hour newscast at 6:30 p.m. on March 14, 2011, which competes against the national network newscasts airing in the timeslot on WBZ, WHDH and WCVB. On July 7, 2012, WFXT expanded the 6 p.m. newscast to Saturday and Sunday evenings; as is common with Fox stations that carry early evening newscasts on weekends, the newscast may be subject to delay or preemption due to network sports telecasts overrunning into the timeslot. On October 7, 2013, WFXT relaunched its 5 p.m. newscast after a four-year hiatus.

Under Cox ownership, a number of significant changes began to occur within WFXT's news department. On November 13, 2014, Doug Goudie, who was well known for his commentary segments during the station's morning show, was released from the station; he stated that his presence did not align with Cox's "philosophy", since they "aren't big on opinions." The removal of "V. B." came as part of a retooling of the Morning News into a conventional newscast, rather than a morning show emphasizing light talk and interview segments (such as Goudie's "Heavy Hitters"). The station restored the weekend morning newscasts in September 2015. The station would also focus less on hard news in favor of a slightly softer format with an abundance of human interest stories, which the station's website termed as "uplifting" stories.

In September 2021, the station laid off several staffers, including sports director Tom Leyden, as part of a series of cuts that also saw the cancellation of WFXT's 4 p.m. newscast (which had launched in 2016) and its Saturday evening newscasts. The cuts followed a period, following Apollo Global Management's acquisition of Cox Media Group, of reduced investment in the station (with an unnamed staffer telling the Boston Business Journal that half of the station's staff had turned over since 2019), as well as a cyberattack against Cox that June.

==== Notable current on-air staff ====
- Gene Lavanchy: anchor
- Butch Stearns: sports reporter

==== Notable former on-air staff ====
- Jodi Applegate: anchor (2001–2004)
- Chris Flanagan: anchor (2016–2022)

== Technical information ==
=== Subchannels ===
The station's signal is multiplexed:

Subchannels of WFXT
Subchannel	Res.	Short name	Programming
25.1	720p	WFXT	Fox
25.2	480i	Charge	Charge!
25.3	480i	LAFF	Laff
66.2	480i	MSGold	MovieSphere Gold (WUNI)
66.3	480i	GetTV	Great (WUNI)

Broadcast on behalf of another station

The Fox subchannel is offered in ATSC 3.0 (NextGen TV) format from the transmitter of WUNI.

=== Analog-to-digital conversion ===
WFXT's analog signal began malfunctioning on November 1, 2008, as a result of a failing transmission line, forcing the station to reduce its power. By December 9, 2008, the transmission line had deteriorated to the point that the station's effective radiated power was reduced to levels where viewers could then only receive the station via cable, satellite or its digital signal in most areas. The station then began to state that the possibility existed that its analog signal might have to be shut down ahead of the analog-to-digital transition deadline for full-power stations, which at that time was scheduled for February 17, 2009. In the end, the station's analog signal remained on the air even after that date (a result of the transition being delayed to June 12, 2009). However, due to the continued failure of the transmission line (to the extent that the station estimated its analog signal was only reaching 3% of its former coverage area, with no signal at all at the station's Dedham studios), WFXT shut down its analog signal, over UHF channel 25, on February 27, 2009, becoming the second English-language major network station in Boston to exclusively transmit a digital signal (WZMY terminated its analog signal in December 2008) and the only Fox-owned station to shut down its analog signal prior to the new June 12 transition date. The station's digital signal continued to broadcast on its pre-transition UHF channel 31, using virtual channel 25.

Many Boston area residents complained about poor reception from WFXT's digital signal compared to the market's other major television stations. This was due to the fact that the transmitter previously operated at a reduced power output of 78 kilowatts from an antenna mounted below one of the tines of the Candelabra tower in Needham. WFXT's vice president of engineering Bill Holbrook stated publicly that the digital signal would not reach full power until August 2009, when installation of a new antenna and transmitter was expected to be completed. However, the signal upgrades were completed in April 2009, giving WFXT a signal considered to be on par with the Boston market's other full-power stations. The new antenna and transmission feedline had been replaced two weeks earlier. The license to cover was filed on April 23, 2009.

== See also ==
- Channel 25 virtual TV stations in the United States
- Channel 34 digital TV stations in the United States
- List of television stations in Massachusetts
- List of United States stations available in Canada
