= Channel 25 low-power TV stations in the United States =

The following low-power television stations broadcast on digital or analog channel 25 in the United States:

- K25AD-D in Victorville, etc., California
- K25BP-D in Billings, Montana
- K25CG-D in Aberdeen, Washington
- K25CK-D in Montpelier, Idaho
- K25CP-D in Tulia, Texas
- K25CQ-D in Childress, Texas
- K25CV-D in Hays, Kansas
- K25DH-D in Meadview, Arizona
- K25DI-D in Silver City, New Mexico
- K25EN-D in Gold Beach, Oregon
- K25FI-D in Mora, New Mexico
- K25FP-D in Ellensburg, Washington
- K25FR-D in Elko, Nevada
- K25FZ-D in Grand Junction, Colorado
- K25GA-D in Redmond/Prineville, Oregon
- K25GE-D in Durango, Colorado
- K25GK-D in Joshua Tree, California
- K25GM-D in Newport, Nebraska
- K25GS-D in Manti and Ephraim, Utah
- K25GY-D in Beryl/Modena/New Castle, Utah
- K25GZ-D in Holyoke, Colorado
- K25HG-D in Preston, Idaho
- K25HJ-D in Hornsby Ranch, etc., New Mexico
- K25HO-D in Wolf Point, Montana
- K25HV-D in Truth or Consequences, New Mexico
- K25II-D in Redwood Falls, Minnesota
- K25IM-D in Medford, Oregon
- K25IP-D in Malad City, Idaho
- K25IW-D in Golconda, Nevada
- K25IX-D in Huntsville, etc., Utah
- K25JJ-D in Fillmore/Meadow, etc., Utah
- K25JO-D in Altus, Oklahoma
- K25JQ-D in May, etc., Oklahoma
- K25JT-D in Blanding/Monticello, Utah
- K25JW-D in Hugo, etc., Oregon
- K25KR-D in Round Mountain, Nevada
- K25KS-D in The Dalles, Oregon
- K25KV-D in Huntington, Utah
- K25KZ-D in Kalispell, Montana
- K25LA-D in Fort Morgan, Colorado
- K25LE-D in Las Animas, Colorado
- K25LF-D in Philipsburg, Montana
- K25LG-D in Tyler, Texas
- K25LH-D in Fishlake Resort, Utah
- K25LI-D in Wright, Wyoming
- K25LJ-D in Tres Piedras, New Mexico
- K25LM-D in Great Falls, Montana
- K25LO-D in Hamilton, Montana
- K25LU-D in Mesquite, Nevada
- K25LY-D in Fargo, North Dakota
- K25MG-D in Flagstaff, Arizona
- K25MK-D in Camp Verde, Arizona
- K25MP-D in Bonners Ferry, Idaho
- K25MR-D in Snowmass Village, Colorado
- K25MW-D in Baudette, Minnesota
- K25MZ-D in Conrad, Montana
- K25NG-D in St. Louis, Missouri
- K25NI-D in Mapleton, Oregon
- K25NJ-D in Sweetgrass, etc., Montana
- K25NK-D in Rochester, Minnesota
- K25NN-D in Nephi, Utah
- K25NO-D in Gasquet, California
- K25NY-D in Bridgeport, Washington
- K25NZ-D in Lewiston, Idaho
- K25OA-D in Dillon, Montana
- K25OB-D in San Antonio, Texas
- K25OG-D in Falls City, Nebraska
- K25OI-D in Soda Springs, Idaho
- K25OJ-D in La Grande, Oregon
- K25OK-D in Yoncalla, Oregon
- K25OM-D in Prescott, Arizona
- K25OO-D in Pendleton, Oregon
- K25OP-D in Kellogg, Idaho
- K25OR-D in McCall, Idaho
- K25OS-D in Thompson Falls, Montana
- K25OT-D in Susanville, etc., California
- K25OU-D in Brookings, South Dakota
- K25OV-D in Cody, Wyoming
- K25OW-D in Marysvale, Utah
- K25OX-D in Hagerman, Idaho
- K25OY-D in Summit County, Utah
- K25OZ-D in East Price, Utah
- K25PA-D in St. George, Utah
- K25PB-D in Rural Iron, etc., Utah
- K25PC-D in Gateway, Colorado
- K25PD-D in Parowan/Enoch/Paragonah, Utah
- K25PE-D in Decorah, Iowa
- K25PF-D in Delta, Oak City, etc., Utah
- K25PG-D in Strong City, Oklahoma
- K25PH-D in Roosevelt, Utah
- K25PI-D in Kasilof, Alaska
- K25PJ-D in Chloride, Arizona
- K25PL-D in Ridgecrest, California
- K25PM-D in Helper, Utah
- K25PO-D in Holbrook, Idaho
- K25PP-D in Eureka, Nevada
- K25PQ-D in Fallon, Nevada
- K25PT-D in Sargents, Colorado
- K25PU-D in Mina/Luning, Nevada
- K25PV-D in Yakima, Washington
- K25PX-D in Lund & Preston, Nevada
- K25PY-D in Leadore, Idaho
- K25QA-D in Odessa, Texas
- K25QB-D in Lucerne Valley, California
- K25QC-D in Lake Crystal, Minnesota
- K25QD-D in Tohatchi, New Mexico
- K25QI-D in Woody Creek, Colorado
- K25QK-D in Anchorage, Alaska
- K25QL-D in Chico, California
- K25QM-D in Palm Springs, California
- K25QS-D in Cortez, Colorado
- K25QT-D in Columbia, Missouri
- KAUN-LD in Sioux Falls, South Dakota
- KCKW-LD in Eugene, Oregon
- KCTL-LD in Livingston, Texas, to move to channel 29
- KDAS-LD in Santa Rosa, California
- KDVD-LD in Globe, Arizona
- KEZI in Oakridge, Oregon
- KFDF-CD in Fort Smith, Arkansas
- KFKY-LD in Springfield, Missouri
- KFLL-LD in Boise, Idaho
- KGCT-CD in Nowata, Oklahoma
- KHAX-LP in Vista, California
- KHPZ-CD in Round Rock, Texas
- KJNK-LD in Minneapolis, Minnesota
- KJPO-LD in Tonopah, Arizona
- KKRA-LD in Rapid City, South Dakota
- KLFA-LD in Santa Maria, California
- KLGC-LD in Alexandria, Louisiana
- KMYA-LD in Sheridan, Arkansas
- KNPL-LD in North Platte, Nebraska
- KOPS-LD in Beaumont, Texas
- KPVM-LD in Las Vegas / Pahrump, Nevada
- KQDF-LD in Santa Fe, New Mexico
- KRHT-LD in Redding, California
- KRRI-LD in Reno, Nevada
- KSVN-CD in Ogden, Utah
- KVCT in Victoria, Texas
- KXCO-LD in Refugio, Texas
- W25AA-D in Onancock, Virginia
- W25AT-D in Tupper Lake, New York
- W25BT-D in Monkton, Vermont
- W25DQ-D in Key West, Florida
- W25ED-D in Albany, Georgia
- W25ER-D in Vero Beach, Florida
- W25FC-D in Jasper, Alabama
- W25FG-D in Philadelphia, Pennsylvania
- W25FH-D in Fort Wayne, Indiana
- W25FI-D in Maplewood, Ohio
- W25FP-D in Young Harris, Georgia
- W25FQ-D in Florence, South Carolina
- W25FR-D in Clarksburg, West Virginia
- W25FS-D in Clarksburg, West Virginia
- W25FT-D in Baraboo, Wisconsin
- W25FW-D in Columbus, Georgia
- W25FX-D in Sutton, West Virginia
- WBNM-LD in Louisville, Kentucky
- WCPX-LD in Columbus, Ohio
- WCQT-LD in Cullman, Alabama
- WCWW-LD in South Bend, Indiana
- WEDK-LD in Effingham, Illinois
- WFEF-LD in Orlando, Florida
- WJGP-LD in Kalamazoo, Michigan
- WJGV-CD in Palatka, Florida
- WJXE-LD in Gainesville, Florida
- WKNI-LP in Andalusia, Alabama
- WLMS-LD in Columbus, Mississippi
- WMEB-TV in East Eddington, Maine
- WNYP-LD in Port Jervis, New York
- WOGC-CD in Holland, Michigan
- WQIX-LD in Vidalia, Georgia
- WTVU-CD in Syracuse, New York
- WTXF-TV (DRT) in Allentown, Pennsylvania
- WUEK-LD in Canton, Ohio
- WVAD-LD in Chesapeake, Virginia
- WWBK-LD in Richmond, Virginia
- WXCB-CD in Delaware, Ohio
- WYAT-LD in Martinsville, Virginia
- WYHB-CD in Chattanooga, Tennessee
- WYOU in Waymart, Pennsylvania

The following low-power stations, which are no longer licensed, formerly broadcast on analog channel 25:

- K25AL in Lake Havasu City, Arizona
- K25CI in Klamath, California
- K25EB in Crowley Lake-Long Va, California
- K25EE in Mountain View, etc., Utah
- K25GJ in Muskogee, Oklahoma
- K25HD-D in Bullhead City, Arizona
- K25HI in Santa Rosa, California
- K25IC in Lawton, Oklahoma
- K25JZ in Walker, Minnesota
- K25KY-D in Fresno, California
- K25LT-D in Cortez, Colorado
- K25ND-D in Mount Vernon, Texas
- KBLM-LP in Riverside and Perris, California
- KHDE-LP in Laramie, Wyoming
- KLDT-LD in Lufkin, Texas
- KPDC-LP in Indio, California
- KSKP-CA in Oxnard, California
- KWJD-LP in Van Nuys, California
- KXLH-LP in Helena, Montana
- W25DX in Escanaba, Michigan
- W25EG-D in Columbus, Georgia
- W25EM-D in Columbus, Georgia
- WBQC-LP in Cincinnati, Ohio
- WMKB-LP in Rochelle, Illinois
- WQEP-LD in Augusta, Georgia
- WSSS-LP in Steubenville, Ohio
- WSVF-LP in Staunton-Waynesboro, Virginia
