= Channel 25 TV stations in Mexico =

The following television stations broadcast on digital channel 25 in Mexico:

- XHAPN-TDT in Apatzingán, Michoacán
- XHAQR-TDT in Cancún, Quintana Roo
- XHAW-TDT in Monterrey, Nuevo León
- XHBR-TDT in Nuevo Laredo, Tamaulipas
- XHBS-TDT in Los Mochis, Sinaloa
- XHCAN-TDT in Cananea, Sonora
- XHCHI-TDT in Chihuahua, Chihuahua
- XHCTCP-TDT in Chilpancingo, Guerrero
- XHCTTA-TDT in Tampico, Tamaulipas
- XHCTVE-TDT in Veracruz, Veracruz
- XHCVO-TDT in Calvillo, Aguascalientes
- XHDF-TDT in Mexico City
- XHEXT-TDT in Mexicali, Baja California
- XHGCO-TDT in Comonfort, Guanajuato
- XHGJ-TDT in Puerto Vallarta, Jalisco
- XHGJG-TDT in Guadalajara, Jalisco
- XHGLP-TDT in San Luis de La Paz, Guanajuato
- XHGTA-TDT in Tarimoro, Guanajuato
- XHHE-TDT in Ciudad Acuña, Coahuila
- XHHPC-TDT in Hidalgo del Parral, Chihuahua
- XHIG-TDT in Matías Romero, Oaxaca
- XHIXZ-TDT in Zihuatanejo, Guerrero
- XHLBU-TDT in La Barca, Jalisco
- XHLEG-TDT in León, Guanajuato
- XHMCH-TDT in Motozintla, Chiapas
- XHOW-TDT in Mazatlán, Sinaloa
- XHPBC-TDT in La Paz, Baja California Sur
- XHPUM-TDT in Puruándiro, Michoacán
- XHPVC-TDT in Felipe Carrillo Puerto, Quintana Roo
- XHSFT-TDT in San Fernando, Tamaulipas
- XHSPC-TDT in San Pedro, Durango
- XHSPJ-TDT in Chetumal, Quintana Roo
- XHSPRVT-TDT in Villahermosa, Tabasco
- XHTLZ-TDT in Tlaltenango, Zacatecas
- XHTMCC-TDT in Ciudad del Carmen, Campeche
- XHVTU-TDT in Ciudad Victoria, Tamaulipas
- XHY-TDT in Mérida, Yucatán
- XHZAM-TDT in Zamora, Michoacán
- XHZMM-TDT in Zitácuaro, Michoacán
