= WCPO-TV =

Television station in Cincinnati

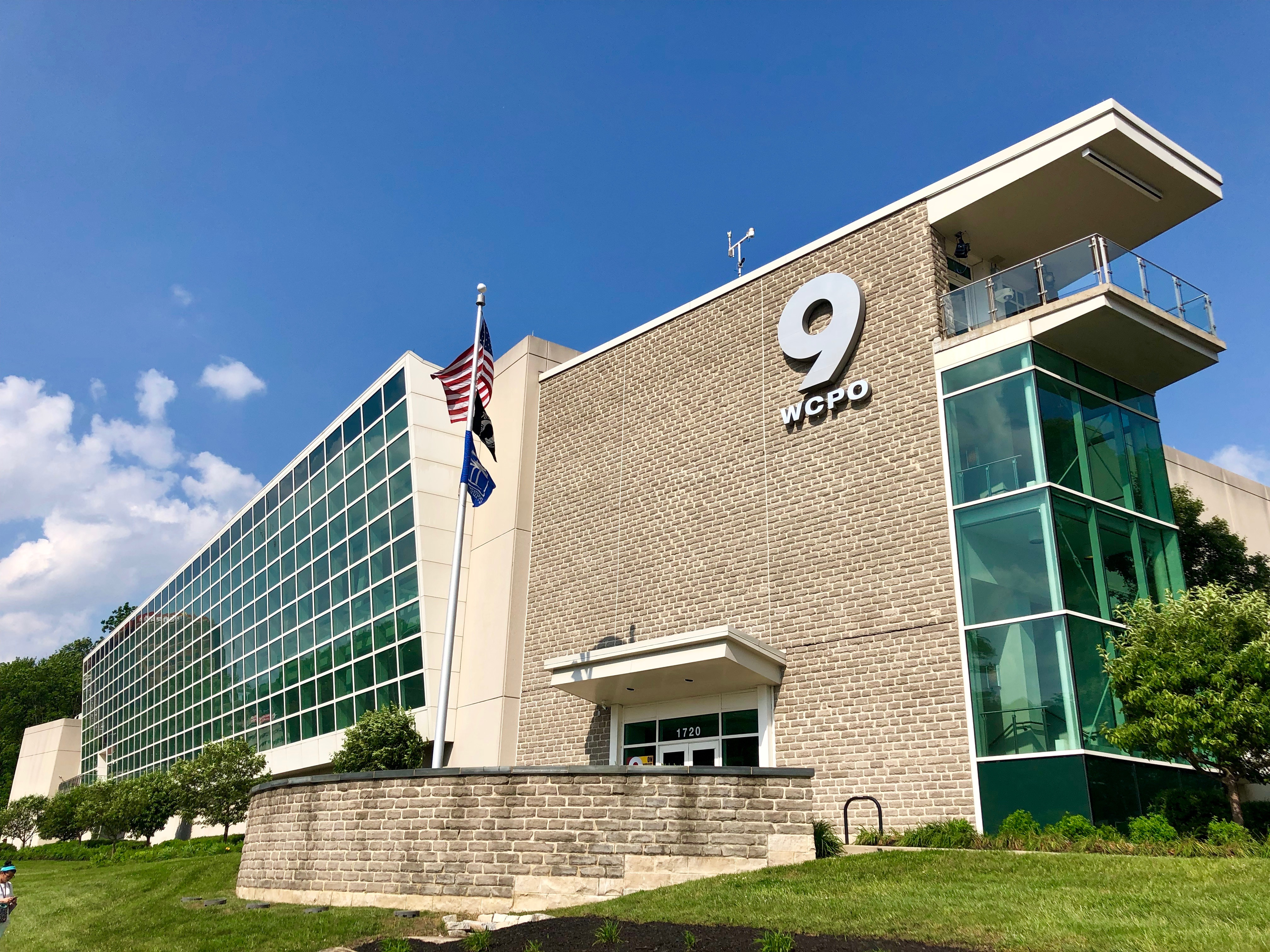
- WCPO-TV station building in Walnut Hills, Cincinnati, Ohio
- Cincinnati, Ohio; United States
- Channels: Digital: 26 (UHF); Virtual: 9
- Branding: WCPO 9

Programming
- Affiliations: 9.1: ABC; for others, see § Subchannels

Ownership
- Owner: E. W. Scripps Company; (Scripps Broadcasting Holdings LLC)
- Sister stations: WKOI-TV

History
- Founded: February 20, 1948
- First air date: July 26, 1949
- Former channel numbers: Analog: 7 (VHF, 1949–1953), 9 (VHF, 1953–2009); Digital: 10 (VHF, 1998–2010), 22 (UHF, 2010–2019)
- Former affiliations: ABC (1949−1961); DuMont (secondary, 1949–1955); CBS (1961–1996)
- Call sign meaning: Cincinnati Post (a now defunct Scripps newspaper)

Technical information
- Licensing authority: FCC
- Facility ID: 59438
- ERP: 1,000 kW
- HAAT: 297 m (974 ft)
- Transmitter coordinates: 39°7′30.4″N 84°29′56″W

Links
- Public license information: Public file; LMS
- Website: www.wcpo.com

WCPO-TV (channel 9) is a television station in Cincinnati, Ohio, United States, affiliated with ABC. It is the flagship television property of locally based E. W. Scripps Company, which has owned the station since its inception. WCPO-TV's studios are located on Gilbert Avenue in the Mount Adams neighborhood of Cincinnati next to the Elsinore Arch, and its transmitter is located at the site of the station's original studios on Symmes Street, in the Walnut Hills section of the city.

== History ==
=== Early history ===
WCPO station identification in 1991, while the station was a CBS affiliate.

WCPO-TV first signed on the air at noon ET on July 26, 1949, and the first face seen was Big Jim Stacey. Originally operating on VHF channel 7, it was Cincinnati's third television station. It was also the third television station to be built from the ground-up and signed-on by the E. W. Scripps Company, following WEWS in Cleveland and WMCT (now WMC-TV) in Memphis. The station's call letters were derived from then-sister radio stations WCPO (1230 AM) and WCPO-FM 105.1, both of which were sold in 1966. Scripps also published The Cincinnati Post, the city's afternoon newspaper whose name served as the basis for the WCPO call letters.

Following the release of the Federal Communications Commission (FCC)'s Sixth Report and Order in 1952, all of Cincinnati's VHF stations changed channel positions. WCPO-TV was reassigned to channel 9, as the previous channel 7 allocation was shifted north to Dayton and later given to WHIO-TV; when the channel shift occurred on March 10, 1953, the station's transmitting power increased to the FCC's maximum of 316 kilowatts.

WCPO-TV was originally a primary ABC affiliate, maintaining a secondary affiliation with the DuMont Television Network until DuMont's demise in 1956. On April 30, 1961, channel 9 traded network alignments with WKRC-TV (channel 12), becoming a CBS affiliate as ABC moved to WKRC-TV. This deal came because WKRC-TV's owner, Cincinnati-based Taft Broadcasting, had developed very good relations with ABC.

WCPO-TV originally broadcast from a studio on Symmes Street in Walnut Hills, adjacent to the station's self-supporting transmission tower; the WCPO radio stations also operated from this location. On June 23, 1967, WCPO-TV moved its studios into a new, modern facility on Central Avenue in downtown Cincinnati.

=== 1980 hostage situation ===
On the early morning of October 15, 1980, WCPO and most of its news staff became part of a major news story when 41-year-old former YMCA employee James Ralph Hoskins of Laurel County, Kentucky, armed with a 9mm J&R M68 semi-automatic rifle and five revolvers, seized control of WCPO's newsroom. Hoskins held reporter Elaine Green and her cameraman at gunpoint in the parking lot of WCPO's studios. He then forced his way into the newsroom and took seven more hostages.

A self-described terrorist, Hoskins stated in a videotaped interview with Green that he had, among other things, murdered his girlfriend Melanie Finlay before arriving at the studios. After voicing his displeasure with local government, Hoskins ended by saying that he would let his hostages go, but only after they helped him to barricade himself in their newsroom in anticipation of a shootout with police. Green and the others pleaded with Hoskins to get help, but to no avail. WCPO's news staff ran special newscasts from the parking lot throughout that morning. Hoskins eventually let all the hostages go, and the standoff ended later that morning when Hoskins shot himself dead while on the phone with SWAT negotiators. Green was given a Peabody Award for her handling of the crisis. She later married anchor and then-news director Al Schottelkotte. The two remained married until his death in 1996.

=== Return to ABC ===
WCPO's logo ca. 2001–2013.

For three decades, WCPO had been one of CBS' strongest affiliates. The Cincinnati market was initially unaffected by the 1994–96 affiliation switches, as the station was in the middle of a long-term affiliation contract with CBS; however, in September 1995, Scripps and ABC announced a 10-year affiliation deal for WCPO. A year earlier, Scripps had agreed to switch three of its other stations (WMAR-TV in Baltimore, KNXV-TV in Phoenix, and WFTS-TV in Tampa) to ABC as a condition of keeping its affiliation on Scripps' two largest stations, WXYZ-TV in Detroit and WEWS-TV in Cleveland. Both of those stations had been heavily wooed by CBS, which was about to lose longtime affiliates WJBK in Detroit and WJW in Cleveland to Fox as part of an affiliation deal with New World Communications.

Scripps had to maintain the CBS affiliation on WCPO until WKRC's affiliation contract with ABC expired the following year; in the meantime, in October 1995, WCPO introduced new "9 Stands for News" station branding that shrunk the CBS logo and revamped its news graphics and theme music, improving ratings. On June 3, 1996, WKRC's contract ended and the two stations reversed the 1961 affiliation swap, with WCPO rejoining ABC and WKRC reuniting with CBS. The last CBS program to air on channel 9 was the 50th Annual Tony Awards at 9 p.m. EDT, while the first ABC program to air was Good Morning America. WCPO set up a toll-free hotline to answer calls from confused viewers. The station debuted new on-air graphics designed by a Los Angeles firm.

On May 15, 2004, WCPO moved its studio facilities from 500 Central Avenue (now the site of an expanded Duke Energy Convention Center) to a new state-of-the-art building on Gilbert Avenue, in the Mount Adams neighborhood of Cincinnati.

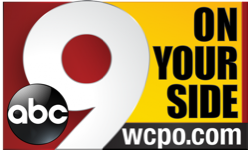
WCPO-TV logo from 2013 to 2020

Scripps' Cincinnati combination of WCPO and The Cincinnati Post ended when the newspaper ceased publication at the end of 2007. (Its Kentucky edition became an online-only publication simultaneously with the closure of the Post.) WCPO is the only major Cincinnati television station that has been under the same ownership since its inception, as well as the only major station in the market to remain owned by a locally based company.

On June 26, 2023, WCPO began airing The Debrief, a nightly newscast airing at 7:30 p.m. originating from and simulcast on Scripps News—Scripps' in-house national news network that airs on subchannel 9.6—as part of a plan by Scripps to integrate Scripps News programming on their main network affiliates as a way to promote Scripps News and increase the network's exposure.

== News operation ==
WCPO-TV presently broadcasts 43 hours of locally produced newscasts each week (with seven hours each weekday and four hours each on Saturdays and Sundays). In recent years, WCPO and WKRC have been battling each other for first place in local news viewership, while NBC affiliate WLWT (channel 5) has been lagging behind in third or fourth place. Typically, WCPO leads the evening news race, while WKRC-TV leads in mornings and late evenings. Even after the affiliation switch in 1996 involving two of the strongest affiliates of their respective networks at the time, both stations have remained among the strongest affiliates of their current respective networks.

WCPO lacked a dedicated news department until 1959. Al Schottelkotte, a longtime columnist for The Cincinnati Enquirer (which was then owned by Scripps along with the Post), joined the station as its first news director and anchorman—a post he held until 1986. Within a year, WCPO was the undisputed local news leader in the Cincinnati market, and remained the top-rated station for over 20 years. Partly because of his influence, the CBS Evening News was not cleared by WCPO for most of Walter Cronkite's tenure; Schottelkotte criticized the program for mostly focusing on world events and believed it "hardly covered anything west of Washington", adding:

Everything you saw [on CBS' newscast] was an epic from Timbuktu. I was not interested in having the people of Cincinnati waste their time with that kind of news.

Consumer reporter John Matarese's reports have been syndicated to nine other stations, five of which are Scripps-owned, since 2003. However, as of October 12, 2010, Matarese's consumer reports have been aired on eleven other stations, the majority of which are Scripps owned.

WCPO began broadcasting its local newscasts in high-definition on August 19, 2007, beginning with the 6 p.m. newscast. Improvements around the station included upgraded weather graphics that match WCPO's upgraded graphics, new panel displays on set (to replace rear-projection CRT monitors on set and old plasma displays with obvious burn-in) and Scripps purchasing JVC HDPro equipment for WCPO. In the summer of 2009, WCPO upgraded its field cameras to provide high definition video.

In December 2009, WCPO reached an agreement with local Fox affiliate WXIX-TV (channel 19) to pool videographers at press conferences.

On October 1, 2012, WCPO-TV debuted the new Scripps-mandated standardized graphics and music package ("Inergy" by Stephen Arnold).

On February 3, 2020, WCPO debuted a new logo and an updated Scripps-mandated graphics and music package, while at the same time dropping the 9 On Your Side moniker in favor of simply WCPO 9 News.

=== 9 First Warning Weather ===
Cincinnati's television stations have used their weather coverage as a selling point, especially since the Montgomery/Blue Ash tornado of 1999. WCPO brands its radars as "9 First Warning Doppler", "VIPIR 9" and "TrueView". The station runs its own radar located in Batavia, which has an average refresh time of ten seconds.

On July 1, 2003, WCPO began to operate a second Doppler weather radar out of the Clermont County Airport in Batavia. In combination with the radar located at WCPO's transmission tower site, both radars were named "Ultimate Doppler Radar", though the transmitter dome was eventually put out of service. The new radar operates at a height of 100 feet (30 m) with its base 834 feet (254 m) above sea level. Attenuation at the site leaves a radius around the radar blank.

In July 2007, WCPO launched a radar system with satellite imagery to allow fine street-level detail of weather events to specific locations. The TrueView system allows for local and nationwide radar sweeps. National Weather Service NEXRAD radars in Wilmington, Ohio (which covers Cincinnati, Dayton and Columbus from a central point, as is done in several areas of the country with multiple major cities), Indianapolis and Louisville are used to provide full-market coverage of severe weather events. The VIPIR 9 technology also utilizes the NEXRAD radars and 9 First Warning Doppler to create its 3D images.

=== I-Team ===
WCPO's investigative unit, the I-Team, was created in 1988, following the station's Peabody Award-winning investigation of Donald Harvey. The I-Team has won dozens of national awards, including the 1992 Sigma Delta Chi Award and 1993 Alfred I. duPont–Columbia University Award for stories about fraudulent business practices. In 1999, WCPO won the Peabody, duPont, and Sigma Delta Chi awards for Laure Quinlivan's investigations into mismanagement of construction of Paul Brown Stadium. The station won another Peabody in 2001 for Quinlivan's one-hour documentary, Visions of Vine Street, that aired commercial-free in prime time in the wake of the 2001 riots.

=== News helicopters ===
In 1967, WCPO introduced the Newsbird, the first news-gathering helicopter in Cincinnati and one of the first in the industry to feature live transmissions. On January 17, 1983, the Bell 206B ran out of fuel and crashed outside the station.

From 1996 to September 2000, WCPO leased a Bell 206L-3 LongRanger III helicopter out of Lunken Field. Outfitted with several cameras, Chopper 9 was used for traffic reports, updates on construction of Paul Brown Stadium and Fort Washington Way, and Friday night football specials. The helicopter proved especially useful for covering the aftermath of the 1999 Blue Ash tornado. WCPO allowed the lease to expire in 2000, citing its high cost.

On February 7, 2014, WCPO debuted another Chopper 9, this time a Bell 206B-3 JetRanger, for daily traffic and news coverage.

In 2016, WCPO debuted Sky 9, a quadcopter drone featuring a 4K-resolution camera. WCPO allowed Chopper 9's lease to expire in February 2020 in favor of Sky 9 drone footage.

=== Notable alumni ===
- Bob Braun – local talk show host/moderator of The Bob Braun Show (1967–1984)
- Andrea Canning – evening anchor
- Gretchen Carlson – reporter
- Nick Clooney – host of The Nick Clooney Show
- Pete Delkus – chief meteorologist (1996–2005)
- Paula Faris – sports anchor
- Brett Haber – weekend sports anchor
- Bill Hemmer
- "Uncle Al" Lewis – first art director for WCPO-TV, channel 9, and host of The Uncle Al Show for 35 years
- Len Mink – singer/host of The Len Mink Show
- Al Schottelkotte – WCPO's first broadcast news anchor and later station news director (1953–1994)

== Technical information ==
=== Subchannels ===
The station's signal is multiplexed:

Subchannels of WCPO-TV
Subchannel	Res.	Short name	Programming
9.1	720p	WCPO-HD	ABC
9.2	480i	CourtTV	Court TV
9.3	480i	Bounce	Bounce TV
9.4	480i	MYSTERY	Ion Mystery
9.5	480i	LAFF	Laff
9.6	480i	BUSTED	Busted
9.7	480i	HSN	HSN
64.5	480i	Comet	Comet (WSTR-TV)

Broadcast on behalf of another station

=== Analog-to-digital conversion ===
WCPO-TV ended regular programming on its analog signal, over VHF channel 9, on June 12, 2009, as part of the federally mandated transition from analog to digital television. The station's digital signal remained on its pre-transition VHF channel 10, using virtual channel 9.

Since many viewers had reception issues after the digital transition, even with an increase of power just weeks after the transition, the station filed a Petition for Rulemaking to abandon VHF channel 10 and move to UHF channel 22. On October 7, 2009, the FCC issued a "Notice of Proposed Rulemaking" for WCPO-TV, which gives the public 25 days to comment on the proposed channel change. On December 10, 2009, the FCC issued a Report & Order, approving WCPO's move from VHF channel 10 to UHF channel 22. On January 19, 2010, WCPO filed a minor change application for a construction permit for their new allotment. The FCC granted the construction permit on July 9. At 2:05 a.m. on December 8, 2010, WCPO performed a flash-cut, turning off channel 10 and starting digital operations on channel 22. This flash-cut also included a power boost to 910 kW.
