= WKRC-TV =

Television station in Cincinnati

- Cincinnati, Ohio; United States
- Channels: Digital: 12 (VHF); Virtual: 12
- Branding: Local 12; Cincinnati CW (12.2)

Programming
- Affiliations: 12.1: CBS; 12.2: CW; 12.3: The Nest

Ownership
- Owner: Sinclair Broadcast Group; (WKRC Licensee, LLC)
- Sister stations: WSTR-TV

History
- First air date: April 4, 1949
- Former channel numbers: Analog: 11 (VHF, 1949–1952), 12 (VHF, 1952–2009); Digital: 31 (UHF, 2001–2009)
- Former affiliations: CBS (1949−1961); ABC (1961–1996); NTA (secondary, 1956–1961)
- Call sign meaning: Kodel Radio Corporation (former owner of former sister AM radio station)

Technical information
- Licensing authority: FCC
- Facility ID: 11289
- ERP: 15.55 kW
- HAAT: 305 m (1,001 ft)
- Transmitter coordinates: 39°6′59″N 84°30′7″W

Links
- Public license information: Public file; LMS
- Website: local12.com; cwcincinnati.com

WKRC-TV (channel 12) is a television station in Cincinnati, Ohio, United States, affiliated with CBS and The CW. It is owned by Sinclair Broadcast Group alongside WSTR-TV (channel 64), an independent station with MyNetworkTV. The two stations share studios on Highland Avenue in the Mount Auburn section of Cincinnati, where WKRC-TV's transmitter is also located.

== History ==
=== Early history ===
WKRC-TV first signed on the air on April 4, 1949, originally operating as a CBS affiliate on VHF channel 11; it is Cincinnati's second-oldest television station, but the first to receive an FCC license. The station was owned by the Ohio-based Taft family, who were active in both politics and media. The Tafts published The Cincinnati Times-Star, and also owned WKRC radio (550 AM and 101.9 FM, now WKRQ) under their broadcasting subsidiary, Radio Cincinnati. In 1958, the Tafts sold the Times-Star to the locally based rival E. W. Scripps Company, owner of The Cincinnati Post and WCPO-AM-FM-TV. The Tafts' broadcasting interests were then reorganized as Taft Broadcasting, with WKRC-AM-FM-TV as the flagship stations. The WKRC stations' call letters were derived from the original owner of WKRC radio, Clarence Ogden of the Kodel Radio Company ("Ko" for Clarence O. and "del" for Della his wife). Following the release of the Federal Communications Commission (FCC)'s Sixth Report and Order, WKRC-TV moved to channel 12 on October 12, 1952.

=== Tri-State Network ===
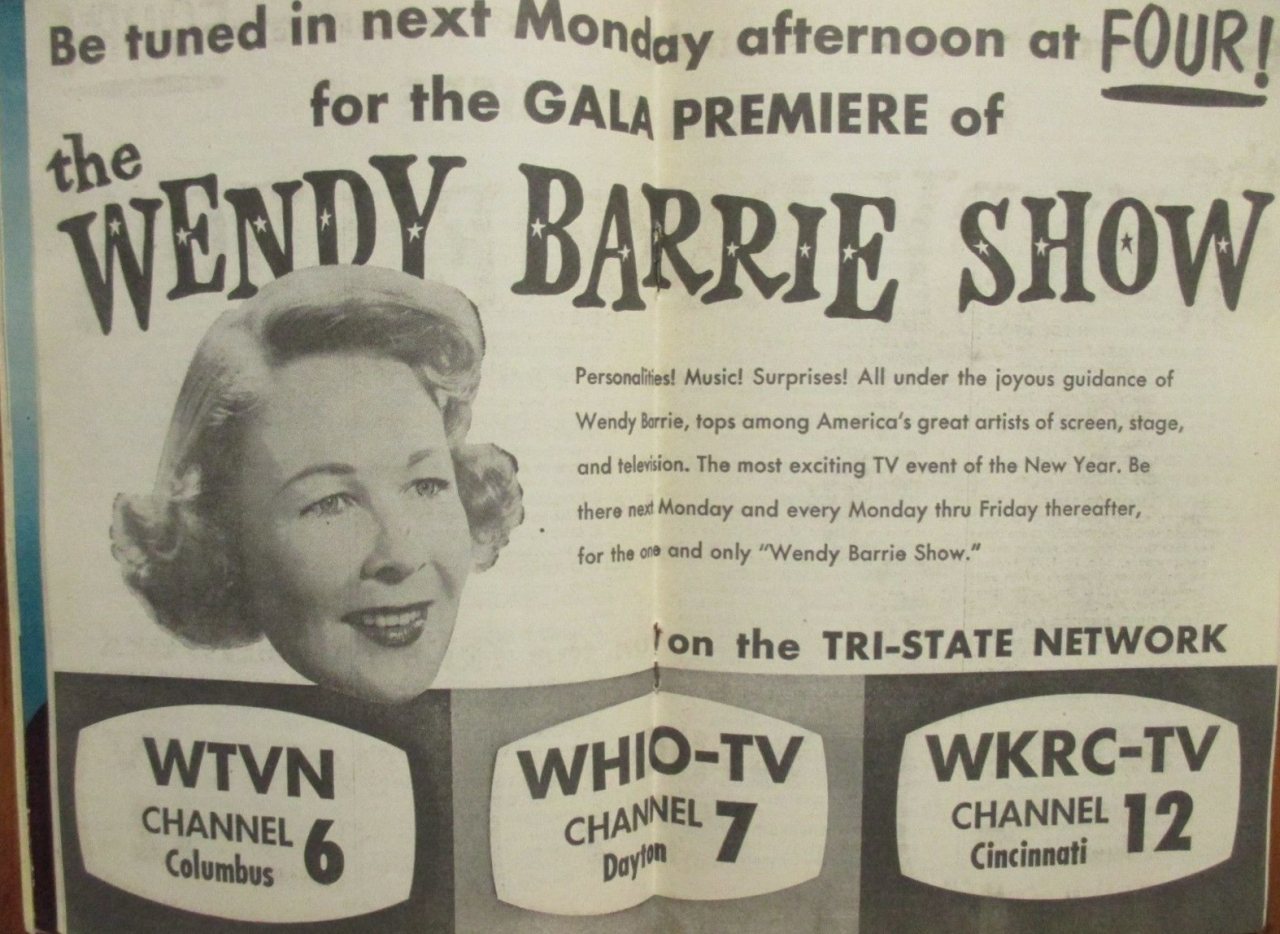
Advertisement for the premiere of The Wendy Barrie Show originating from WHIO-TV in Dayton and simulcast on WKRC-TV in Cincinnati and WTVN (now WSYX) in Columbus, all in Ohio

In 1953, three television stations owned by Taft Broadcasting Company and Cox Enterprises formed the short-lived "Tri-State Network" to compete with entertainment programming produced by Crosley Broadcasting Corporation on Crosley television stations in the Cincinnati, Columbus and Dayton broadcast markets. On January 11, 1954, The Wendy Barrie Show premiered from the studios of WHIO-TV in Dayton, simulcast on Taft Broadcasting's WKRC-TV in Cincinnati and WTVN (now WSYX) in Columbus. Barrie's contract was terminated in October 1954, and she was replaced by her co-host of nine months, Don Williams.

=== As an ABC affiliate ===
In 1961, the station became an ABC affiliate, switching networks with WCPO-TV. This came after that network's founder Leonard Goldenson persuaded Taft president Hulbert Taft Jr., a longtime friend, to switch several of the company's stations to ABC. During the late 1950s, the station was also briefly affiliated with the NTA Film Network. WKRC's nickname in the 1960s was "Tall 12", a reference to the station's transmitter tower which was the tallest in Cincinnati at the time. Like WCPO-TV, channel 12 used a distinctive jingle ID at the top of the hour in the 1960s. The upbeat, orchestrated "Channel 12" jingle was followed by children's show host Glenn Ryle announcing: "This is WKRC-TV Cincinnati". Also, during its tenure with ABC, WKRC (through ABC) aired a number of animated shows produced by Hanna-Barbera, which Taft purchased in 1967. In 1975, it began airing movies on late night Saturdays in a program called The Past Prime Playhouse. Hosted live by local personality Bob Shreve, the show would air until 1988.

On June 23, 1983, after a yearlong field trial, WKRC began broadcasting teletext magazines to Cincinnati-area owners of Electra decoders, making Cincinnati the first market in the United States where teletext was commercially available. WKRC broadcast 100 screens of information and games, along with closed captioning of ABC programming, from 8 a.m. to 11 p.m. daily. Electra's manufacturer, Zenith Electronics, marketed the service with a mobile demonstration van at locations around the city to promote sales of its decoder. David Klein, the media critic for The Cincinnati Post, wrote a negative review of the service, noting slow loading time, unengaging content, and primitive graphics. WKRC's teletext magazine was later syndicated nationally by Satellite Syndicated Systems.

In 1987, Taft was dissolved in a hostile takeover of its board and all of its stations (except WTVN-TV in Columbus and WGHP-TV in High Point, North Carolina) were absorbed into Great American Broadcasting. In 1993, Great American Broadcasting became Citicasters shortly before filing for bankruptcy. The Electra service shut down that year.

=== Return to CBS ===
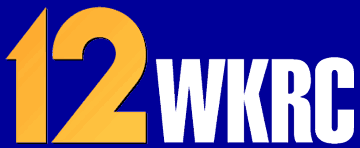
"12 WKRC" logo, used from 1994 to 2004 with the slogan "A New Generation of News"

While Cincinnati was initially unaffected by the 1994–96 affiliation switches, as WCPO was in a middle of a long-term affiliation contract with CBS, such contract was abruptly stopped. WKRC returned to CBS in 1996, reversing the 1961 affiliation swap. WCPO had agreed to affiliate with ABC in September 1995, but WKRC's contract with ABC was not set to expire for another year. In May 1996, WKRC began airing half-hour-long special programs detailing upcoming programming changes at the two stations. On June 3, 1996, WKRC's contract ended, and WKRC rejoined CBS while WCPO rejoined ABC. The last ABC program to air on WKRC was the ABC Sunday Night Movie airing of the 1993 telefilm The Only Way Out, and the first CBS program since it rejoined was CBS This Morning.

In September 1996, WKRC was acquired by Jacor after most of Citicasters' other television stations were sold to New World Communications, which had become involved in an affiliation deal with Fox that was announced in May 1994. The Jacor deal reunited channel 12 with its AM sister, which had been bought by Jacor in 1993 during Great American Broadcasting's bankruptcy reorganization. Jacor merged with Clear Channel Communications in 1998.

Although owned by Clear Channel at the time, the station changed its branding to "Local 12" in 2003. This was inspired by the "Local Mandate", a station brand standardization adopted by Post-Newsweek Stations for its own television stations.

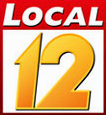
Original "Local 12" logo used from 2004 to September 2009

In 2006, Clear Channel ranked WKRC as the top CBS affiliate in the United States. On November 16 of that year, the company announced that it would sell its entire television division, including WKRC, after being bought by private equity firms in order to focus on its radio and event properties. On April 20, 2007, Clear Channel entered into an agreement to sell its stations to Providence Equity Partners. Providence Equity teamed up with Sandy DiPasquale to form a new holding company, Newport Television, for the station group. Concurrently, Clear Channel applied to place WKRC and several other stations to the Aloha Station Trust just in case Newport Television failed to close on the group. However, as a result of Newport Television closing on the purchase of WKRC and the other stations on March 14, 2008, Aloha Station Trust and the would-be new owners of Clear Channel opted not to consummate on the acquisition of the station. As a result, Newport Television became WKRC's fourth owner in just over 20 years. As a result of the sale, the Citicasters name disappeared from WKRC's license, dissolving channel 12's last link to Taft Broadcasting; the Citicasters name is still alive as a holding company within the corporate structure of Clear Channel's successor, iHeartMedia.

On June 18, 2008, Newport announced that it was eliminating 7.5% of the jobs at its 56 stations, attributing the layoffs to a weak economy. As a result, WKRC fired 18 staff members. On July 19, 2012, Newport Television reached deals to sell 22 of its 27 stations to three station groups – Nexstar Broadcasting Group, Sinclair Broadcast Group and Cox Media Group. WKRC-TV was among the six sold to Sinclair. WSTR-TV (channel 64) was transferred to Deerfield Media (who also received San Antonio's CW affiliate KMYS in the same deal) because the Cincinnati market, despite being the 35th-largest market, has only seven full-power commercial stations, which are not enough to legally permit a duopoly. However, Sinclair retained control of WSTR through a local marketing agreement. The deal also reunited WKRC-TV with WSYX (the former WTVN-TV), another station formerly owned by Taft. The sale was completed on December 3.

== WKRC-DT2 (The CW Cincinnati) ==
WKRC-DT2, branded on-air as The CW Cincinnati, is the CW-affiliated second digital subchannel of WKRC-TV, broadcasting in high definition on channel 12.2.

=== History ===
On January 24, 2006, the Warner Bros. unit of Time Warner and CBS Corporation announced that the two companies would shut down The WB and UPN and combine the networks' respective programming to create a new "fifth" network called The CW. WKRC signed a deal to affiliate with the new network on a new second digital subchannel resulting in UPN affiliate WBQC-CA (channel 25) becoming an independent station. Meanwhile, WB affiliate WSTR-TV joined another new network, News Corporation-owned MyNetworkTV (now owned by Fox Corporation) which launched on September 5. With the affiliation, WKRC-DT2 became the largest subchannel-only CW affiliate by market size, and was one of the few such stations located in the top 100 markets (most CW-affiliated stations that carry the network via a subchannel are located in the 110 smallest U.S. television markets and carry The CW Plus, an automated feed featuring a pre-packaged schedule of syndicated programs outside CW programming hours; the few that are located among the top 100—such as WTVG-DT2 in Toledo—maintain an independently programmed schedule as their primary channel counterparts do). This distinction ended on May 31, 2017, when San Diego's CBS affiliate, KFMB-TV, affiliated its DT2 subchannel with The CW (which had previously been carried on the primary feed of Tijuana, Mexico-based XETV).

Cincinnati cable viewers were concerned that WKRC-DT2 would face the same problems as WBQC. For years, Time Warner Cable had refused to carry that station full-time, and eventually the station brokered an agreement to air WB prime time on a leased access channel which was barely promoted. However, Time Warner Cable was a division of Time Warner at the time (who would be half-owner of The CW), so it was in the company's best interest to air WKRC-DT2 over its systems. By late in the day on September 17, Time Warner Cable agreed to carry the new station only hours before the network's launch on September 18. WKRC-DT2 launched on Time Warner channel 2 in prime time only to start out with and 24 hours a day on digital cable channel 913, before earning a full-time broadcast basic placement on channel 20 as of October 18, displacing WBQC and a commercial access channel. The station also debuted on Insight Communications and DirecTV under WBQC's former channel slots. As a result, the channel can be viewed by 66% of the local population.

While now branded as simply "The CW Cincinnati", the subchannel originally branded as "The CinCW", a portmanteau with "Cincy", a common nickname for the city. It currently airs the entire CW schedule in-pattern with films and syndicated programming (and sometimes second runs of WKRC's programming) airing outside network hours along with occasional coverage of high school sports and/or telecasts from FC Cincinnati on weekends. In the event of breaking news (either from WKRC or CBS News) or sports coverage, WKRC-DT2 airs CBS programming when needed. Repeats of some shows formerly aired by WKRC, along with the second half of CBS' Face the Nation, can also be seen. Through The CW, it also carried the daily self-titled talk show of local WLW radio personality Bill Cunningham until that show ended in 2016.

Due to a conflict on Bally Sports Ohio, WKRC-DT2 aired a Blue Jackets game on April 4, 2023.

== Programming ==
During its first few years as a CBS affiliate, WKRC-TV ran the entire schedule except for several hours of the CBS Saturday morning cartoon lineup which would soon be reduced to only a few hours. Once that reduction was made, WKRC-TV began running the entire CBS schedule with occasional exceptions.

=== Sports programming ===
In 1998, the station became the primary home market outlet for most Cincinnati Bengals games when CBS acquired the AFC broadcast rights. Previously, most Bengals games aired on WLWT as NBC carried the AFC. Until 2023, WKRC also annually simulcast coverage of the Cincinnati Reds opening day game from what is now FanDuel Sports Network Ohio.

=== Past program preemptions and deferrals ===
Over the years, as an ABC affiliate, WKRC-TV preempted moderate amounts of weekday programming and the Sunday morning cartoon reruns from ABC; when an ABC game show hosted by WKRC-TV personality Nick Clooney, The Money Maze, aired from December 1974 to June 1975, WKRC opted to delay that program from the national scheduled time of 4 p.m. to 10:30 a.m. the following day, so it would be presented in tandem with their local talk program, The Nick Clooney Show, at 11 a.m. Other shows delayed by WKRC included Friday night sitcoms Here Come the Brides (delayed to nine days after their original ABC airing) and The Brady Bunch (delayed to the following afternoon). It also briefly ran instrumental music over the closing credits of prime time network shows in lieu of program promos during the 1973-74 season. At one point during the 1987-88 season, WKRC briefly preempted the 8:30 p.m. ABC prime time slot (occupied by such shows as I Married Dora, Mr. Belvedere and part of the first season of Full House) in favor of the syndicated sitcom Small Wonder.

When ABC offered late night programming from 11:30 p.m. to about 2 a.m., WKRC, as with several other ABC affiliates, chose not to air it. However, it aired Nightline once that show began in 1979 as a program on the Iran hostage crisis. Occasionally, WKRC preempted a lower-rated prime time program or movie from ABC to air either a stronger movie or a locally based special. Most of the programs not shown on WKRC were widely preempted by many affiliates. Also, most every program not shown on WKRC-TV was aired on the ABC station in nearby Dayton, WKEF until 1980 and WDTN after 1980. WKEF provided grade B coverage to most of the market, while WDTN provided city-grade coverage to nearly the entire market. Locally, WKRC aired news, talk shows, movies, and a few off-network sitcoms at some points. Beginning in 1992, WKRC-TV began preempting portions of ABC's Saturday morning cartoons in favor of a local Saturday morning newscast. For a while, WKRC-TV was also one of the very few ABC affiliates that did not clear This Week with David Brinkley, choosing to air religious programs instead.

Regardless of its network, at least one program airing on both, The Edge of Night, always had shabby treatment in Cincinnati, which was ironic because the series' producer Procter & Gamble was headquartered there, and Edge's fictional locale of Monticello was loosely based on the city. WKRC did not clear that program as late as 1958, but by 1960–1961 (its last initial season as a CBS affiliate) it telecast the program at 10 a.m. When ABC picked the program up in 1975, it originally carried the ABC run at 11 a.m. By fall 1976 the show was airing on WKRC at 10:30 a.m., and by May 1981 it was on at 9 a.m. WKRC had an unusual broadcast of the 90-minute ABC premiere. It aired the first hour from 3 to 4 p.m. on December 1. The final 30 minutes was telecast December 2 at 11 a.m., where all subsequent episodes aired on a one-day delay.

=== News operation ===
The Weather Beacon atop the Chiquita Center indicating "no change in sight"

WKRC currently broadcasts 41 1/2 hours of locally produced newscasts each week (with seven hours each weekday, four hours on Saturdays and 2 1/2 hours on Sundays); it also produces an additional 13 1/2 hours of newscasts weekly (with 2 1/2 hours each weekday and a half-hour each on Saturdays and Sundays) for WSTR. WKRC's newscasts and reports were formerly seen on the Ohio News Network until the regional cable news channel shut down on August 31, 2012. During weather segments, it uses regional weather radar data in a system called "Precision Doppler 12 Network".

For most of its history, WKRC has been a solid runner-up to WCPO in the local newscast ratings. However, in the past decade or so, WKRC and WCPO have taken turns in first and second place. WKRC usually wins on weekday mornings and at 11 p.m., while WCPO leads in the 5 to 7 p.m. block. However, since the May 2010 Nielsen ratings period, WKRC has dominated its competition in all newscast timeslots, with WCPO slipping to second. This dominance in the Cincinnati local news race continued as of the May 2012 sweeps period. At one point, all three of Cincinnati's "Big Three" network affiliates were locally owned. WLWT began falling behind in the ratings after becoming the first of the three to be sold to outside interests. WCPO is now the only one of the three to remain under locally based ownership.

From 1977 to 1992, its news division was branded Eyewitness 12 News. (The Eyewitness News moniker would be reused by WLWT in 1998.) Afterward, the station was usually announced as 12 News. With the arrival of chief meteorologist Tim Hedrick in 1988, WKRC began using the top of the Chiquita Center as its weather beacon.

In 1994, WKRC refreshed its newscasts with the slogan "A New Generation of News", which referred to anchors Kit Andrews and Rob Braun, along with new graphics, a green screen set, and music originally composed by Rick Krizman for KRON-TV in San Francisco. WKRC made extensive use of "Texta", a graphics package that included a persistent on-screen banner with the current story's headline. Seasonal school closing information and eventually a news ticker appeared below the Texta headline. That October, WKRC debuted 11 minutes of "Non-Stop News" on its 11 p.m. newscast, reviving a feature the station attempted in 1989. In 1996, the station debuted a half-hour 4 p.m. newscast on weekday afternoons that remains the Cincinnati area's earliest afternoon newscast.

From August 22, 2001, to January 2005, WKRC aired its weekday Good Morning Cincinnati broadcast live from a $500,000 remote studio at the Greater Cincinnati Convention and Visitors Bureau on the ground floor of Fifth Third Bank's downtown headquarters, with the Tyler Davidson Fountain as the backdrop. Despite WKRC's initial hopes for a Today-like atmosphere, the show failed to attract a regular crowd on Fountain Square. From March 2004 to 2008, WKRC aired Nuestro Rincón ("Our Corner"), a twice-weekly Spanish-language news program hosted by Sasha Rionda. It was the only television program in the market airing in a language other than English.

On April 26, 2006, WKRC entered into a news share agreement with WSTR to produce a nightly prime time newscast at 10 p.m., which began airing on August 21. On January 7, 2008, WKRC began simulcasting Good Morning Cincinnati on WKRC-DT2; it had been aired on the main channel from 5 to 8 am, but the third hour was dropped when CBS reclaimed the 7 a.m. hour for The Early Show, after the network required all of its affiliates to air the show (which was replaced by CBS This Morning in 2012) in its entirety after receiving a makeover hoping to better compete against its rivals, NBC's Today and ABC's Good Morning America. The 7–8 a.m. hour of Good Morning Cincinnati is now only seen on WKRC-DT2. WKRC announced its intent to move the prime time newscast on WSTR to WKRC-DT2 in August 2008; on August 4, 2008, it began a brief simulcast of the program on WKRC-DT2, with it eventually being dropped from WSTR on August 22. The program then became known as CW News at 10.

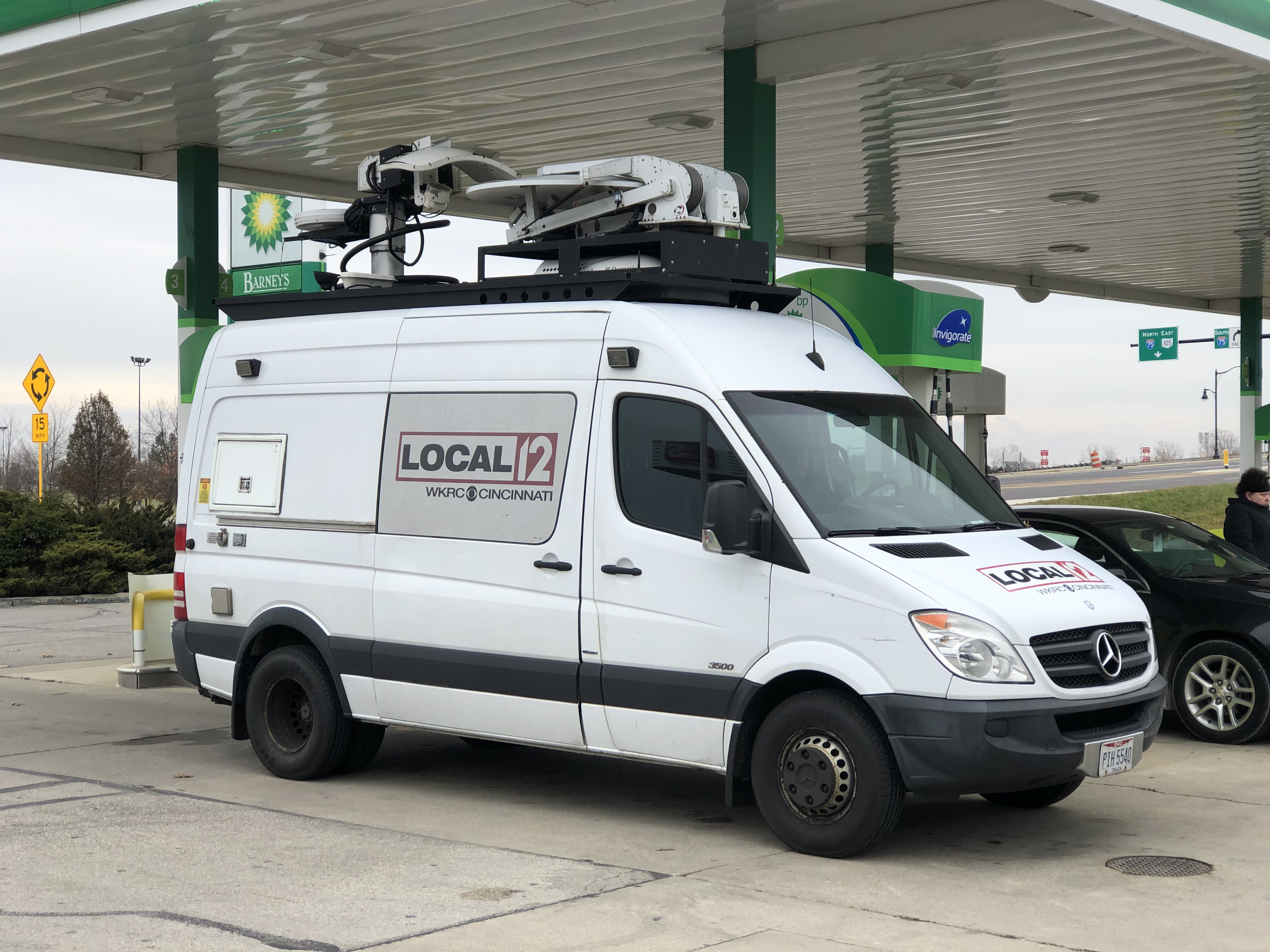
A WKRC news vehicle

Newport Television released a statement in October 2008 stating that WKRC would eventually begin broadcasting its newscasts in 1080i high definition. The company used channel 12 as a pilot station before investing in HD equipment for its other television stations. On October 30, it debuted a new set on its First at 4 broadcast in preparation for the HD debut. After nearly a year of delay, the station launched its high definition newscasts along with a revised logo and new graphics on September 27, 2009, during its 11 p.m. newscast; WKRC became the third station in the Cincinnati market (after WCPO and WXIX-TV, channel 19) and the second in the Newport group (after WOAI-TV) to make the upgrade. WKRC currently use JVC ProHD 250 Series cameras in its studios. The newscasts on The CW Cincinnati were not initially included in the upgrade, until it upgraded to HD at some point in 2013. On July 7, 2013, WKRC launched Sunday morning newscasts, airing in two blocks: one hour at 8 a.m. and an additional half-hour at 11:30 a.m. On January 6, 2014, the 10 p.m. newscast was moved back to WSTR, where it is called the Local 12 News at 10 on STAR 64. On February 3, 2014, the 7 a.m. newscasts would follow suit to WSTR.

==== Notable alumni ====
- George Ciccarone – features reporter
- Nick Clooney – hosted his own talk show on WKRC in the early to mid-1970s, news anchor from 1975 to 1984 (father of George Clooney)
- Ira Joe Fisher – weather anchor (1980–1983, then 1985–1989, known for writing backwards on plexiglass)
- Brad Johansen – news and sports anchor (1992–2018)
- Sasha Rionda – reporter/host of Nuestro Rincón
- Glenn Ryle – staff announcer (1954–late 1980s, was also a children's show host, taking the on-air name "Skipper Ryle" until 1973; his program was second only to WCPO-TV's Uncle Al show in popularity)
- Rod Serling – worked for WKRC-TV between 1948 and 1953, writing a regular weekly series of live dramas for the anthology show The Storm.
- Bob Shreve – host of Saturday late night film showcase The Past Prime Playhouse (1975–1985)
- Linda Vester – station intern

== Technical information ==
=== Subchannels ===
The station's signal is multiplexed:

Subchannels of WKRC-TV
Subchannel	Res.	Short name	Programming
12.1	1080i	CBS	CBS
12.2	720p	CW	The CW
12.3	480i	TheNest	The Nest
64.2	480i	Antenna	Antenna TV (WSTR-TV)
64.3	480i	Charge!	Charge! (WSTR-TV)

Broadcast on behalf of another station

=== Analog-to-digital transition ===
WKRC-TV ended regular programming on its analog signal, over VHF channel 12, on June 12, 2009, as part of the federally mandated transition from analog to digital television. The station's digital signal relocated from its pre-transition UHF channel 31 to VHF channel 12.
