= Local News Service =

Resource sharing in American local television news

The name Local News Service refers to a variety of news resource share services all started in 2008 and 2009. It sometimes does not refer to a specific sharing service but to the category in general. Typically, these services include pooling video crews to cover routine events and sharing helicopters used for newsgathering.

For 2009, the biggest development for local TV was content pooling.

NBC-Fox partnerships are called Local News Service.

== History ==
Since 2000, Fox News, ABC and CBS have been partners in a national news pool partnership.

In January 2009, NBC Local Media and Fox Television Stations set up the first Local News Service with their Philadelphia stations after testing since the summer 2008. Fox and NBC then added other markets where they both own stations. In March, the first local news pool not formed by the NBC-Fox alliance was formed in Columbus, OH by Media General's WCMH-TV and Sinclair Broadcast Group's WSYX and WTTE. On April 1, Fox Stations entered into its first pooling agreements without NBC in Phoenix (KSAZ-TV) with Scripps' KNXV-TV and Meredith's KPHO-TV and in Detroit (WJBK) with Scripps's WXYZ-TV. The Fox (WFLD)-NBC (WMAQ-TV) partnership on May 11 started its Chicago pool its first with outside members: Tribune's WGN-TV and CBS's WBBM-TV. On June 29, 2009, six weeks after the start of the Atlanta group, WGCL-TV exited the pool as they considered it restraining their ability to differentiation. The Orlando local news service launched July 16, 2009 is the first to include a local news cable channel, Central Florida News 13.

== Issues ==
There is some concern that these agreements will cause local news coverage to be overly similar "or will enhance it." The involved stations claim that it will help the stations by allowing more specialized reporting by not tying up resourcing for routine events. Many of the stations involved have reduced news staff due to decreased advertising revenue. Fracturing audiences will continue the revenue decline and the need to continue to reduce costs. These partnerships are a natural solution along with outsourcing and other partnerships and content sharing to the revenue decline. However, the member stations may use the local news services as a reason for even more reduction in personnel. Others say that it will be difficult for rivals to work together.

== News share services ==
Market	Launch date	Station	Owner
Philadelphia	Test: Summer 2008; January 2009	WCAU	NBCUniversal
Philadelphia	Test: Summer 2008; January 2009	WTXF-TV	Fox Television Stations
Washington, DC	June 15, 2009	WUSA	Tegna
Washington, DC	June 15, 2009	WRC-TV^{a}	NBCUniversal
Washington, DC	June 15, 2009	WTTG^{a}	Fox Television Stations
Boston	June 1, 2009	WFXT	Cox Media Group
Boston	June 1, 2009	WBZ-TV	Paramount
Chicago	May 11, 2009	WGN-TV	Nexstar
Chicago	May 11, 2009	WFLD	Fox Television Stations
Chicago	May 11, 2009	WBBM-TV	Paramount
Chicago	May 11, 2009	WMAQ-TV	NBCUniversal
Phoenix	April 1, 2009	KSAZ-TV	Fox Television Stations
Phoenix	April 1, 2009	KNXV-TV	Scripps
Phoenix	April 1, 2009	KPHO-TV	Gray
Cleveland	April 2009	WKYC	Tegna
Cleveland	April 2009	WOIO	Gray
Columbus, OH	March 2012	WCMH-TV	Nexstar
Columbus, OH	March 2012	WSYX	Sinclair
Columbus, OH	March 2012	WTTE	Sinclair
Atlanta	May 18, 2009	WAGA-TV	Fox Television Stations
Atlanta	May 18, 2009	WANF	Gray^{1}
Atlanta	May 18, 2009	WXIA-TV	Tegna
Tampa	June 2, 2009	WTVT	Fox Television Stations
Tampa	June 2, 2009	WFTS-TV	Scripps
Tampa	June 2, 2009	WTSP	Tegna
Detroit	April 1, 2009	WJBK	Fox Television Stations
Detroit	April 1, 2009	WXYZ-TV and WMYD	Scripps
Los Angeles	June 15, 2009	KTTV	Fox Television Stations
Los Angeles	June 15, 2009	KTLA	Nexstar
Los Angeles	June 15, 2009	KNBC	NBCUniversal
New York	June 22, 2009	WNYW^{a}	Fox Television Stations
New York	June 22, 2009	WNBC^{a}	NBCUniversal
New York	June 22, 2009	WCBS-TV	Paramount
New York	June 22, 2009	WPIX	Nexstar
Grand Rapids, MI	July 13, 2009	WOOD-TV	Nexstar
Grand Rapids, MI	July 13, 2009	WWMT	Sinclair
Grand Rapids, MI	July 13, 2009	WZZM	Tegna
Orlando, FL	July 16, 2009	WKMG	Graham Media Group
Orlando, FL	July 16, 2009	WOFL	Fox Television Stations
Orlando, FL	July 16, 2009	Spectrum News 13	Charter
Dallas^{h}	January 9, 2009	KDFW	Fox Television Stations
Dallas^{h}	January 9, 2009	KXAS-TV	NBCUniversal

a. Also share in an "aerial news footage partnership" h. Helicopter shares 1. WANF, then called WGCL-TV, dropped out of the news share pool.

== Helicopter shares only ==
Market	Station	Owner
Phoenix	KTVK	Gray
Phoenix	KPHO-TV	Gray
Phoenix	KPNX	Nexstar
Denver	KCNC	CBS Television Stations Inc
Denver	KDVR / KWGN	Nexstar
Denver	KMGH	Scripps
Denver	KUSA / KTVD	Nexstar

== See also ==
- Concentration of media ownership
- Local marketing agreement
- Media cross-ownership in the United States
