= List of Otterbein University alumni =

Otterbein University is a liberal arts college in Westerville, Ohio and is affiliated with the United Methodist Church. It has a total student enrollment of about 3,100 students. Below is a list of notable alumni:

== Athletes ==
- Harold Anderson, NCAA basketball coach and member of the Hall of Fame
- Ernest Barnard, president of the American League 1927–1931; owner of Cleveland Indians
- Matt D'Orazio, pro football quarterback; offensive player in ArenaBowl XX
- Butch Hartman, five-time USAC stock car national champion
- Drew Kasper, professional wrestler
- Jim McKee, Major League Baseball player
- Paul O'Neill, Major League Baseball player
- Steve Traylor, college baseball coach at Florida Atlantic, Duke, and Wofford

== Artists ==
- Evelyn Svec Ward, class of 1943, fiber artist

== Composers ==
- Benjamin Hanby, composer of over 80 songs and hymns, including "Darling Nelly Gray" and the Christmas songs "Up on the House Top" and "Jolly Old Saint Nicholas"

== Actors, entertainers ==
- Jonathan Bennett, television actor
- Jeremy Bobb, actor
- Jordan Donica, stage actor
- David Graf, television actor, known for the Police Academy series
- Rachael Harris, actress and comedian
- Dee Hoty, actress
- Sam Jaeger, television actor
- Chris Jansing, television anchor and correspondent
- Gordon Jump, actor, "Big Guy" Carlson in the television series WKRP in Cincinnati
- Cabot Rea, reporter and television news anchorman; current co-anchorman of WCMH in Columbus, Ohio
- Cory Michael Smith, actor, plays Edward Nygma (aka the Riddler) in Fox's television series Gotham
- Frances Lee Strong (née Myers) or Grandma Lee, stand-up comedian
- Bryan Thao Worra, writer

== Politicians ==
- John Karefa-Smart, politician from Sierra Leone; current leader of the United National People's Party
- Lance Lord, retired Air Force four-star general; former commander, Air Force Space Command
- Zeola Hershey Misener, suffragist and one of the first women elected to the Indiana General Assembly
- Kazuya Shimba, Japanese politician, member of the House of Councillors (2001–present), secretary-general of DPFP (2020–present), former state minister for Foreign Affairs (2012), former state minister of Defense (2009–2010), member of Assembly of Kikugawa Town, Shizuoka (1994–1998)
- Chalmers Wylie, Republican U.S. congressman, 1967–1993

== Religion ==
- Judith Craig, bishop of the United Methodist Church, recipient of Doctor of Divinity degree

== Honorary alumni ==
- Jack Hanna, zoologist
