= DeMoss =

DeMoss is a surname. Notable people with the surname include:

- Bingo DeMoss (1889–1965), American baseball player
- Bob DeMoss (1927–2017), American football player
- Darcy DeMoss (born 1963), American actress
- Grace DeMoss (born 1927), American golfer
- Harold R. DeMoss Jr. (born 1930), American judge
- Hugh DeMoss (1932–2003), American journalist and politician
- Mary Hissem De Moss (1871–1960), American soprano singer
- Mickie DeMoss (born 1955), American basketball player and coach
- Nancy DeMoss Wolgemuth (born 1958), American Christian radio host and author
