= Cabot Rea =

American journalist

Cabot Rea is an American former reporter and television news anchorman. He was the evening and night co-anchorman for WCMH, the NBC affiliate in Columbus, Ohio.

In 1978, Rea graduated from Otterbein College in Westerville, Ohio with a degree in music education. He taught music in Newark, Ohio, and was twice teacher of the year at Wilson Junior High. Also a professional singer and actor, Rea toured in a production of Camelot and was the principal baritone at the Ohio Light Opera Company.

Rea started at WCMH in 1985 as a weekend sports and daily feature reporter for the station, and received an Emmy Award for a feature news story on Camp Reams, a corrections facility in Lancaster, Ohio.

On October 14, 2015, he announced that by the end of December 2015 he would retire from working at NBC4 news. He had been there for 30 years.

Rea briefly served as the co-anchorman on the nightly news at WWHO, the Columbus UPN affiliate.

He teaches radio and television performance at Otterbein College.

Until recently, Rea served as the host of the Miss Ohio Pageant since 1986.

Rea has a wife, Heather, and three children: Josh, Meredith, and Cassie.
