= Otterbein University =

Private university in Westerville, Ohio, US

Coordinates: 40.12573°N 82.93613°W

- Former names: Otterbein University (1847–1917; 2010–present); Otterbein College (1917–2010)
- Type: Private university
- Established: 1847; 179 years ago
- Religious affiliation: United Methodist
- Endowment: $134.8 million (2025)
- President: John Comerford
- Faculty: 300 (fall 2023)
- Students: 2,357 (fall 2023)
- Undergraduates: 2,119 (fall 2023)
- Postgraduates: 238 (fall 2023)
- Location: Westerville, Ohio, U.S.
- Campus: 140 acres (57 ha)
- Colors: Tan and Cardinal
- Nickname: Cardinals
- Sporting affiliations: NCAA Division III – OAC
- Mascot: Cardy the Cardinal
- Website: otterbein.edu

Otterbein University is a private university in Westerville, Ohio, United States. The university was founded in 1847 by the Church of the United Brethren in Christ and named for United Brethren founder, Philip William Otterbein. It has been associated since 1968 with the United Methodist Church.

It is primarily an undergraduate institution with approximately 2,100 undergraduate and 240 graduate students on campus. The school's mascot is Cardy the Cardinal and the school is a member of the Ohio Athletic Conference in NCAA Division III athletics.

== History ==
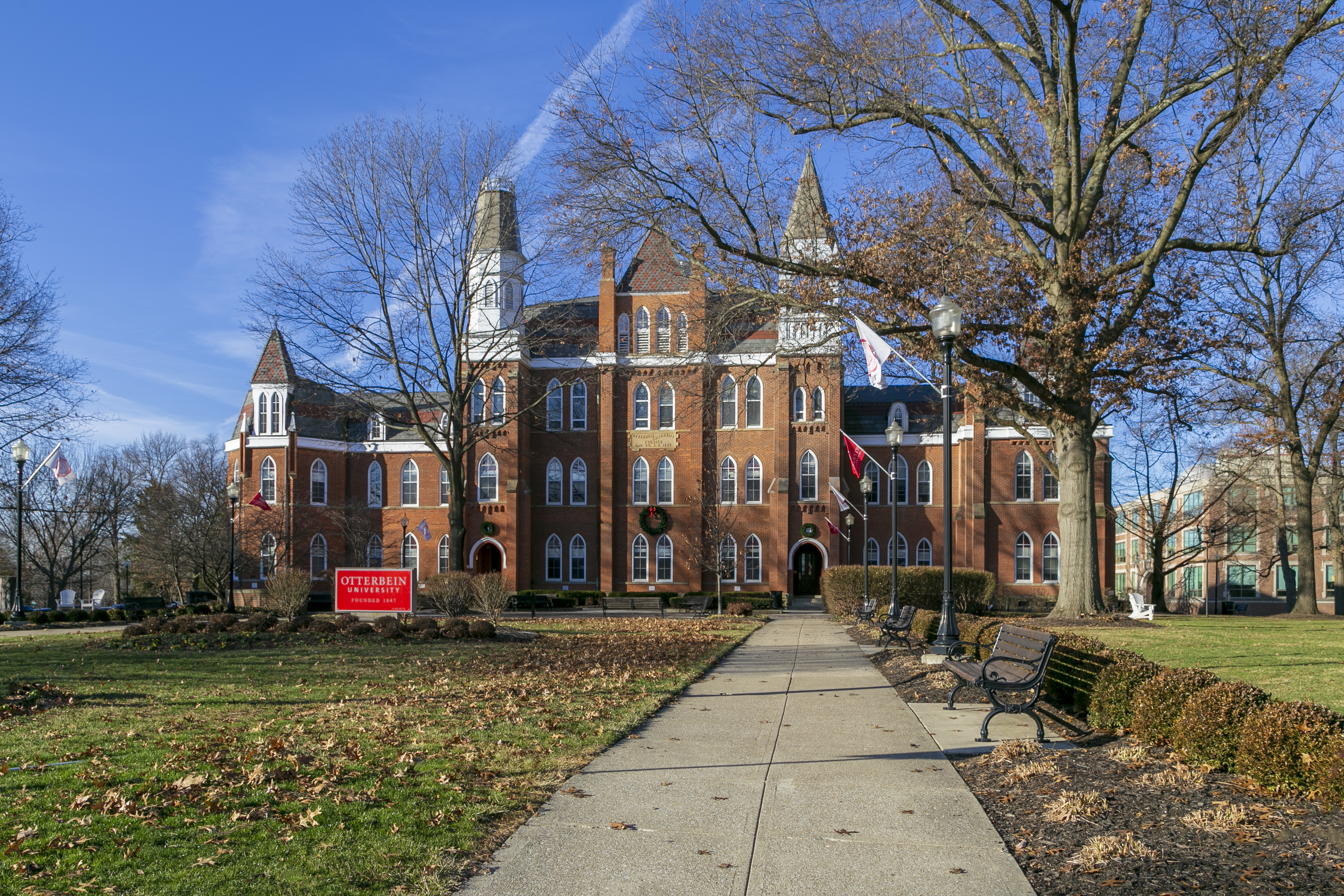
Towers Hall

Otterbein University was founded in 1847 by the Church of the United Brethren in Christ. The university is named for United Brethren founder Philip William Otterbein.

As a result of a division and two mergers involving the Church, the university has since 1968 been associated with the United Methodist Church. In 2010, due to an increasing number of graduate and undergraduate programs, its name was changed back from Otterbein College to Otterbein University.

Otterbein University and Antioch University came together in 2023 to create an umbrella organization called the Coalition for the Common Good (“CCG”). The arrangement was not viewed as a merger, but instead as a business alliance intended to benefit both parties, and perhaps sweep in additional institutions in the future. CCG became the official parent of both colleges, but subject to each institution retaining a certain amount of autonomy. Around the end of August, 2026, Antioch filed suit against CCG, alleging CCG was attempting a “hostile takeover” of the university in violation of the CCG by-laws.

== Campus ==
The Otterbein campus is located in Westerville, Ohio. It sits between Alum Creek on the west and State Street (Ohio State Route 3) on the east. West Home Street, which runs through the center of campus, is the address of most of the college's homes and student residence halls (such as 25 [Suite Style Residence], Mayne Hall, Hanby Hall, 163 W. Home Street, and Clements Hall), as well as the Campus Center. The north end of the campus is home to most underclassman housing, the health and physical education department, athletic facilities, as well as the Clements Recreation Center. The Campus occupies 140 acres (0.57 km^{2}).

== Academics ==
It offers 74 majors and 44 minors, as well as eight graduate programs. Otterbein requires students to take a broad variety of courses. It offers B.A., B.S., B.F.A., B.Mus., B.M.E., B.S.E., B.S.N., MAE, MBA, MSN, and DNP degrees in 74 majors and 41 minors. Since Fall 2011, the university has run on the semester calendar. Otterbein University's graduate school features programs in business administration (MBA), nursing (MSN, DNP), education, Educational mathematics, and science in allied health.

=== School of Art & Sciences ===
The School of Arts and Sciences houses departments and programs in: art, life science, biochemistry & molecular biology, chemistry, communications, earth science, English, English as a second language, history, mathematical sciences, modern languages & cultures, music, philosophy, physics, political science, psychology, religion, sociology & anthropology, and theatre & dance. Otterbein also has programs in theatre, dance, music, and film.

=== Study abroad ===
Twenty-eight percent of Otterbein students study abroad. The university sponsors semester-long programs in four locations—London, England; Barbados; Paris, France; and Madrid, Spain—and several short-term summer programs in locations such as Nicaragua, all of which are staffed by Otterbein professors. Students can also choose to study in a variety of other countries through alternative providers.

=== School of Professional Studies ===
The School of Professional Studies houses departments and programs in business, accounting & economics, education, engineering, equine science, health & sports sciences, and nursing.

=== Rankings and admission ===
In its 2012 edition of "America's Best Colleges", Otterbein was ranked 14th in the "Regional Universities (Midwest)" category by U.S. News & World Report. U.S. News & World Report classifies its selectivity as "more selective." In its 2018 edition of "America's Best Colleges", Otterbein was ranked #19 (tie) in the "Regional Universities (Midwest)" category, #12 (tie) in the "Best Colleges for Veterans" category, and #35 in the "Best Value Schools" category by U.S. News & World Report. Schools are ranked according to their performance across a set of widely accepted indicators of excellence. Other awards include: the President's Higher Education Community Service Honor Roll for 6 straight years.

=== Music program ===
The Department of Music at Otterbein offers the degrees of Bachelor of Music, Bachelor of Music Education, and Bachelor of Arts in several majors including music theory and composition, music history and literature, jazz studies, and general music studies. The music program at Otterbein includes multiple genre programs, as well as an opera theatre program. The Concert Choir tours nationally and internationally. Other ensembles include Marching Band, Opus One vocal jazz, Cardinal Singers (formerly Women's Chorale), Vox Otterbein (formerly Men's Chorus), Otterbein Singers, The Anticipations rock cover band, Jazz Combo, Early Music, and Red Noise, the new music ensemble. Since 2021, string players have played in the OtterCap Orchestra, an ensemble consisting of music students from Otterbein University and Capital University. The music department is housed in Battelle Fine Arts Center. Graduates go on to teach music in K-12 schools, perform in professional opera, symphony orchestras, and bands, compose music, and teach privately.

=== Theatre & Dance Program ===
Professional training is offered in the areas of Acting, Design/Technology, and Musical Theatre with BFA degrees offered in all three programs and a dance concentration in the latter. A BA degree in Theatre is also available, which allows students to tailor the major to suit their interests in directing, writing, and stage management among others. Curriculum focuses on providing hands-on experiences, including five mainstage productions per year with performances that are open to the public. Classes and most public performances are held at the Fritsche Theatre at Cowan Hall on Otterbein's campus. Some performances are held at the Campus Center Theatre. Additional professional development opportunities are offered to graduating seniors: professional internships for Theatre Design & Technology students and a Senior Showcase for Acting and Musical Theatre students that is hosted in New York City and attended by agents and casting directors.

To apply for admission, prospective students first submit a pre-screening video. After passing the pre-screening, they submit the Otterbein University admissions application and must audition in person, either on campus or at one of the National Unified Audition sites.

Famous alumni of Otterbein University’s Theatre & Dance Program include James Scully, Rachael Harris, Jonathan Bennett, and David Graf. Otterbein University is accredited by the National Association of Schools of Theatre.

== Athletics ==
Otterbein Cardinals wordmark

The Otterbein athletics teams are named the Cardinals. The university competes in NCAA Division III, as a member of the Ohio Athletic Conference.

Otterbein's traditional opponents include: Baldwin Wallace University, Capital University, Heidelberg University, John Carroll University, Marietta College, University of Mount Union, Muskingum University, Ohio Northern University, Ohio State University, and Wilmington College.

They sponsor a total of 12 varsity sports, including baseball, basketball, cross country, football, golf, lacrosse, soccer, softball, tennis, track and field, volleyball, and wrestling.

== Greek life ==
Otterbein's history of social Greek organizations dates back to 1908, when members of the debate society started Pi Beta Sigma fraternity, with Sigma Alpha Tau sorority being founded in 1910. 12 of the 14 Greek chapters on campus are local, meaning they were founded and exist only at Otterbein. There are six sororities and eight fraternities at Otterbein; all six sororities are local, while six fraternities are local and two are national. Within their Greek Life they have two of the oldest independent chapters in the United States, Pi Beta Sigma and Pi Kappa Phi (not connected to the national Pi Kappa Phi).

== WOBN ==
WOBN, whose frequency is 97.5 FM, is Otterbein's student-run radio station.

== Residence halls ==
=== Traditional residence halls ===
- Clements Hall (Sophomore Housing)
  - Clements Hall houses 106 upperclassmen men and women on four floors including four RAs.
- Davis Hall (Health & Wellness LLC)
  - Davis Hall is home to 110 first year and upper class students as well as six resident assistants and one assistant director of Residence Life. Most of the rooms are doubles. This two-story building features at least one lounge on each floor and the laundry room and kitchen are located on the first floor.
- Dunlap King Hall (Arts Appreciation, Open Space & Radical Creativity LLC)
  - Dunlap-King (DK) is the oldest residence hall on campus. It houses 96 first year and upper class students including four Resident Assistants.
  - Dunlap King Hall has a theme of Arts Appreciation, is home to the Radical Creativity LLC and Open Space. Arts Appreciation is for students interested in the arts but not necessarily majoring in art, music, or theatre.
- Engle, Garst and Scott Halls (The Triad)
  - The Triad is a complex consisting of three buildings for first year and upper class students: Scott Hall, home to 36 men or women including two Resident assistants; Engle Hall, home to 45 men or women including two resident assistants; and Garst Hall, home to 75 students including three resident assistants and one assistant director of Residence Life.
  - Garst Hall is available for continuous housing, meaning the building is always open during winter break and summer (daily fee applies).
  - Garst and Scott Halls are single-story buildings. Engle Hall has two floors.
- Mayne Hall (Leadership LLC & Honors Community)
  - Mayne Hall is the home for 138 first year and upper class students including seven Resident Assistants. Mayne Hall is home to the Honors Housing program and the Leadership LLC. Residents in Mayne Hall may participate in the Kneading Minds program, which is run through the Honors Program, and bakes bread once a month in the hall kitchen.
  - Mayne Hall has four floors with women residing on first, third and fourth floors and men on the second floor. Two single rooms are located on the first floor with all other rooms being doubles.
- Hanby Hall (STEM Community)
  - Hanby Hall accommodates 121 first-year students, including six Resident Assistants and one Hall Director. Most rooms in Hanby are doubles with one triple located on each upper floor. Hanby Hall is connected to Clements Hall through the west stairwell. Students call the Clements and Hanby community "Clanby".

=== Suite style housing ===
- Kerr Hall
  - Opened in the fall of 2008, 25 W. Home Street is one of Otterbein's two suite-style residence halls housing 200 upper class students including six Resident Assistants and one assistant director of Residence Life. Renamed in 2023 to Kerr Hall.
- DeVore Hall
  - DeVore Hall was opened in Fall 2006 as Otterbein's first suite-style residence hall. Housing 174 upperclassman students including six Resident Assistant.

=== Commons apartments ===
- Home Street and Park Street
  - The Commons apartment complexes are located in two areas on campus. Each complex consists of four small buildings providing apartment housing for juniors and seniors located in the heart of campus.
  - Selection for the apartments occurs in spring semester. Rising juniors and seniors may apply for an apartment with a group of students. Each year, three buildings at each complex are available for Summer + Academic Year leases, which begin the second Monday after graduation. The remaining building is only available for Academic Year leases, which begin the day before classes begin in the fall, due to summer deep cleaning and minor renovations (painting, carpeting, etc.).

=== Theme houses ===
Theme houses are an on-campus living option for students with a common goal. Residents of each house are expected to create and take part in programming events to benefit the residents, the special interest group they represent, and the campus community. Any full-time sophomore, junior or senior Otterbein student in good standing with the university is eligible to live in a university-operated house.

Each house is advised by a university academic or administrative department which determines the selection process for students residing in the individual houses.

Houses are eligible for gender-inclusive housing, meaning students residing in the houses may determine if the house will be gender inclusive or single sex. All residents must agree to the status prior to signing an agreement to live in the house.

==== Current theme houses ====
- The Education House - 162 W. Home Street
  - Residents living in the Education House are education majors. These students support one another through the Education Program and plan programs for the Columbus City Schools, leadership development and student teaching. Residents serve as role models to freshmen education majors and those going through the student teaching process. In addition, they host a variety of meetings, programs, and socials sponsored by the Education Department.
- The Spiritual Growth House (SGH)- 155 W. Home Street
  - The Spiritual Growth House (SGH) is a unique living environment for students interested in learning more about themselves on a spiritual and personal level. Students can engage and interact in conversations with members of the Otterbein Christian Fellowship and learn more about Religious Life. This year, the house will plan numerous events regarding prayer and religion and host a variety of socials open to the campus community.
- The House of Black Culture - 154 W. Home Street
  - The House of Black Culture (HBC) is named after Otterbein's first African American graduate, William Henry Fouse. The HBC was established in 1994 and serves as a meeting and social space for African American students. The house offers living space to individuals who are involved in the African American Student Union and/or other diversity organizations on campus. The HBC promotes cultural exchange for the Otterbein community through programming and discussions. The HBC also assists the Office of Social Justice & Activism by hosting receptions for visiting guests. Signature programs include a Welcome Back Cookout and End of the Year Cookout.
- GLTBQ Resource House - 46 W. Home Street
  - The GLBTQ Resource House is located near 25 W. Home.

== Notable alumni ==
- Harold Anderson, 1924, men's basketball coach at Bowling Green State University and the University of Toledo.
- Jonathon Bennett, actor, attended but did not graduate
- Bob Corbin, former member of the Ohio House of Representatives
- Matt D'Orazio, 1999, Arena Football League quarterback, 2-time ArenaBowl MVP, ArenaBowl XX, 2006; ArenaBowl XXII, 2008.
- Susan Diol, television actress
- Agnes Meyer Driscoll, American cryptanalyst during both World War I and World War II
- Henry Clay Frick, attended but did not graduate; business partner in Andrew Carnegie's Carnegie Steel Company, later a major American art patron.
- Anne Gonzales, member of Ohio House of Representatives
- David Graf, 1972, actor, best known for his role as Sgt. Eugene Tackleberry in the Police Academy series of films
- Benjamin Russell Hanby, 1858, American composer of over 80 songs and hymns, including "Darling Nelly Gray", "Up on the House Top", "Jolly Old Saint Nicholas", and "Who Is He In Yonder Stall?".
- Lillian Resler Keister Harford, 1872, church organizer and editor
- Rachael Harris, 1989, film and television actress and comedian.
- Butch Hartman, attended circa 1960, USAC national stock car champion
- Dee Hoty, 1974, Tony-nominated Broadway actress
- Sam Jaeger, 1999, American actor, best known for his role as Matt Dowd in the ABC television series Eli Stone
- Chris Jansing (born Christine Kapostasy), 1978, American television news correspondent. Currently working for NBC News as NBC's Senior White House Correspondent.
- Dominic Jones, 1987, Arena Football League defensive back.
- Gordon Jump, 1955, actor, best known his role as Arthur Carlson in WKRP in Cincinnati
- Fred Martinelli, 1951, Hall of Fame Football coach at Ashland University
- Jim McKee, 1969, pitcher for the Pittsburgh Pirates
- Zeola Hershey Misener, suffragist and one of the first women elected to the Indiana General Assembly
- Ladan Osman, Sillerman First Book Prize-winning poet
- Leif Pettersen, 1973, slotback who played eight seasons in the Canadian Football League for the Saskatchewan Roughriders and the Hamilton Tiger-Cats.
- Cabot Rea, 1978, television news anchorman, formerly served as the evening and night co-anchorman for WCMH in Columbus, Ohio.
- Micheaux Robinson, AF2, CFL, and Arena Football League defensive back.
- James Scully, 2014, actor, best known for his role as Forty Quinn in the Netflix television series You
- Cory Michael Smith, actor, best known for his role as Edward Nigma (Riddler) in the Fox television drama series Gotham.
- Steve Traylor, 1973, college baseball coach at Florida Atlantic, Duke, and Wofford.
- Frank Truitt, 1950, collegiate basketball coach at Ohio State University, Louisiana State University, and Kent State University; co-founder of Otterbein University's golf team.
- Carroll Widdoes, 1926, Head football coach at Ohio State University and Ohio University.
- John Finley Williamson, 1911, choral music pedagogue and founder of Westminster Choir College.
