= Channel 28 branded TV stations in the United States =

The following television stations in the United States brand as channel 28 (though neither using virtual channel 28 nor broadcasting on physical RF channel 28):

- WSYX-DT3 in Columbus, Ohio (this station coincidentally broadcasts on physical RF channel 28)
