= WTTE =

Television station in Columbus, Ohio

- Columbus, Ohio; United States
- Channels: Digital: 27 (UHF); Virtual: 28

Programming
- Affiliations: 28.1: Roar; 28.2: Antenna TV; 28.3: Great

Ownership
- Owner: Cunningham Broadcasting; (Columbus (WTTE-TV) Licensee, Inc.)
- Operator: Sinclair Broadcast Group
- Sister stations: WSYX, WWHO

History
- First air date: June 1, 1984
- Former channel numbers: Analog: 28 (UHF, 1984–2009); Digital: 36 (UHF, 2002–2019)
- Former affiliations: Independent (1984–1986); Fox (1986–2021); UPN (secondary, 1995–1997); Kids' WB (secondary, 2000–2001)
- Call sign meaning: "Television Twenty-Eight"

Technical information
- Licensing authority: FCC
- Facility ID: 74137
- ERP: 1,000 kW
- HAAT: 271 m (889 ft)
- Transmitter coordinates: 39°56′14″N 83°1′16″W

Links
- Public license information: Public file; LMS

WTTE (channel 28) is a television station in Columbus, Ohio, United States, airing programming from the digital multicast network Roar. It is owned by Cunningham Broadcasting and operated by Sinclair Broadcast Group alongside ABC/Fox affiliate WSYX (channel 6) and CW affiliate WWHO (channel 53), and the three stations share studios on Dublin Road. WTTE's transmitter is located in the Franklinton section of Columbus.

WTTE was the third station built by Sinclair. It signed on June 1, 1984, as the first mainstream independent station in the Columbus market, joining the Fox network at its launch two years later. After years of false starts, it began airing a local newscast in 1996 produced by WSYX, which was then under separate ownership. When Sinclair was able to acquire WSYX from River City Broadcasting in 1998, it transferred the WTTE license to Glencairn, Ltd.—predecessor to Cunningham—and continued to run it under a local marketing agreement. The newscasts on WTTE were the highest-rated produced by the two stations' combined news operation. In 2021, the Fox program stream moved from WTTE to Sinclair-owned WSYX and was replaced on channel 28 by TBD, a Sinclair-owned digital multicast television network.

== Prior attempt to build channel 28 ==
Peoples Broadcasting Company, a subsidiary of Columbus-based insurer Nationwide Mutual Insurance Company and licensee of radio stations WRFD and WNCI in Columbus, was selected for the construction permit for channel 47 in Columbus by a Federal Communications Commission (FCC) hearing examiner in 1966. It then received the permit in May 1967. Peoples Broadcasting—renamed Nationwide Communications later in 1967—intended to name its new station WNCI-TV. NCI applied in January 1968 for a taller tower and higher-power facilities than initially proposed and began lengthy discussions with WOSU-TV (channel 34), the noncommercial educational station owned by Ohio State University, to potentially share a tower. However, Ohio State had objections about a high-power facility interfering with its radio astronomy observatory, blotting out weaker signals.

In January 1970, the FCC approved a proposal by Nationwide, formulated in conjunction with Ohio State, to make a three-way channel shift to resolve the issue. This moved channel 47 from Columbus to Mansfield, whose channel 31 was moved to Newark for use by WGSF, whose channel 28 allocation was shifted to Columbus for WNCI-TV. Nationwide entered into an agreement to pay half the cost of a new tower in Westerville, to be shared by WOSU-TV and WNCI-TV. Soon after, Nationwide opted not to construct WNCI-TV in light of a pending rulemaking at the FCC that proposed limiting one company to owning one television station, one radio station, or one newspaper in a market. Nationwide, which already owned AM and FM stations, arranged to sell the permit to the Columbus-based Laurel Broadcasting Company. The FCC approved the transaction at a reported value of $288,000 in August 1971, but the deal fell through weeks later after the parties reached an impasse.

== History ==
=== Early years ===
In January 1976, the Commercial Radio Institute (CRI) of Baltimore announced its intention to file for channel 28. It chose Columbus after passing on prospects in Boston and Louisville, Kentucky. Shortly after, a second application was received by Christian Voice of Central Ohio, owner of Christian radio station WCVO (104.9 FM) in Gahanna, which proposed a religious and family-friendly outlet in contrast to the more traditional independent station format contemplated by the Commercial Radio Institute. FCC administrative law judge David Kraushaar ruled in favor of the Commercial Radio Institute application in October 1979 because Christian Voice of Central Ohio already owned a station in the market. Christian Voice appealed, expressing a desire to sell WCVO if necessary to obtain channel 28. It was unsuccessful in overturning the initial decision at the FCC's review board and with the United States Court of Appeals for the District of Columbia Circuit.

Construction on the station, dubbed WTTE, finally began to move ahead in 1983 after the company secured revenue bonds from Franklin County; work to add channel 28 to WOSU-TV's tower began. However, WTTE was bogged down by continual delays. By October, the station was still months away from air, even though CRI had secured a studio site at 6130 Sunbury Road. Wet weather left the tower site muddy and made it impossible to maneuver heavy equipment, leading the station to scrap an April 1984 planned sign-on.

WTTE began broadcasting on June 1, 1984. It was CRI's third station after independent outlets in Baltimore (WBFF) and Pittsburgh (WPTT-TV). Its format—children's shows, reruns, movies, and religious programs—was familiar to those used to independent stations elsewhere in the country but not so much in Columbus. It also provided an outlet for programming that the local network affiliates passed up, including sporting events not aired by NBC affiliate WCMH-TV (channel 4) and ABC station WTVN-TV (channel 6, now sister station WSYX). WTTE joined the Fox network at its launch in October 1986. That same year, the Commercial Radio Institute broadcasting division took the name Sinclair Broadcast Group.

As early as 1989, WTTE officials floated the possibility of airing a 10 p.m. newscast, either by setting up an in-house news department or by partnering with another station. In 1990, general manager Mike Quigley told Columbus Business First that the station was targeting 1991 to debut such a newscast on weeknights, though the $2 million start-up costs had resulted in delays to the plan. A newscast continued to be discussed by Quigley for years. When WCMH-TV debuted a 10 p.m. newscast on WWHO (channel 53) in 1994, observers believed it had been hurried to air to spoil a pending joint venture between WTTE and CBS affiliate WBNS-TV (channel 10), the market's leading local news station.

WTTE became a secondary affiliate of UPN when the network launched in January 1995. UPN programs aired in alternative time slots to not conflict with Fox shows. Where UPN shows aired on Monday and Tuesday nights in the network's first year, WTTE presented the network on Saturday and Sunday. This arrangement ended in January 1998 after WWHO was sold to Paramount Stations Group, the network's owned-and-operated stations division, and added UPN programming to its WB affiliation.

=== Consolidation with WSYX and newscasts ===
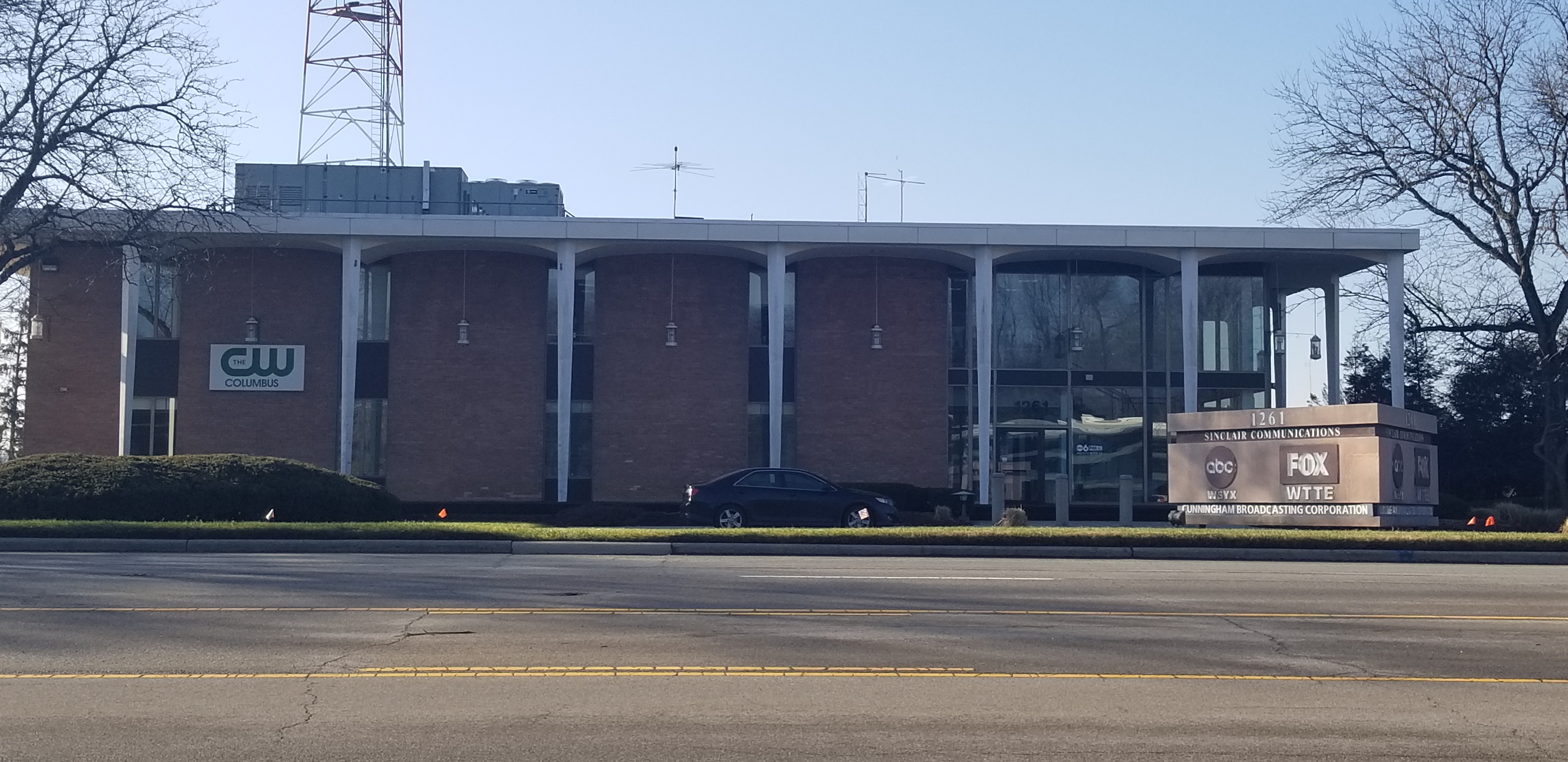
WSYX/WTTE/WWHO studios in Columbus. "Cunningham Broadcasting Corporation" is displayed on the bottom row of the front monument sign, signifying the owner of WTTE's license assets.

In 1996, Sinclair Broadcast Group announced the purchase of St. Louis–based River City Broadcasting, which in Columbus owned ABC affiliate WSYX. The deal was soon amended at the behest of federal regulators to omit WSYX, which Sinclair had originally planned to control under a local marketing agreement (LMA). In spite of Sinclair not immediately buying WSYX, the station became very important to WTTE. On September 16, 1996, WSYX began producing a newscast for WTTE, Fox News at 10, from its studios. The arrangement was similar to one adopted by Sinclair-owned Fox affiliate WDKY-TV in Lexington, Kentucky, the year prior. It was anchored by Lorene Wagner, a former reporter and anchor for WSYX and WBNS-TV. While it had a dedicated set and news anchors, it drew on WSYX for weather and sports personalities. Fox News at 10 made a strong showing, quickly eclipsing the WCMH-TV–produced WWHO newscast in the ratings. The WWHO news was canceled in October 1997, leaving WTTE with the only 10 p.m. news program in Columbus.

The U.S. Department of Justice approved Sinclair to acquire WSYX's non-license assets, including its facilities and personnel, in 1998. Sinclair then exercised its option to buy the WSYX license and sold the WTTE license to Glencairn, Ltd. for $2.3 million. The deals triggered the consolidation of the two stations in WSYX's facilities and under WSYX's general manager; Wagner moved to WSYX's evening newscasts and was replaced on WTTE by Kirstin Cole, a WSYX reporter and weekend anchor. Fox News at 10 was expanded to a full hour later in 1998. Local newscasts from both stations were combined under the umbrella brand NewsCenter in September 1999.

WTTE's final logo as a Fox affiliate, 2000–2021. The logo was slightly modified in 2021 to include the WSYX call sign when its intellectual property moved to WSYX 6.3.

In April 2000, WWHO dropped Kids' WB programming entirely; it downgraded its WB affiliation to essentially secondary status in order to air UPN programming in pattern, though it continued to air all WB prime time shows. While WTTE could not pick up the entire children's lineup because of its own Fox Kids offering, weekday airings of the Pokémon anime were added to WTTE's schedule under agreement with The WB.

The NewsCenter partnership extended to morning news beginning in August 2000, when WTTE debuted a 7 a.m. extension of WSYX's morning newscast. An 8 a.m. hour was added in 2005, bringing the stations' total morning news output to four hours. In 2005, WTTE became the home of Ohio Lottery drawings under an agreement that saw the lottery pay less than it had been to WBNS-TV. By this time, WTTE's 10 p.m. newscast was the highest-rated news program on either station. In May 2014, WTTE was the highest-rated Fox affiliate in prime time in the United States, and its 10 p.m. newscast had twice as many viewers as WSYX at 11 p.m.

=== Move of Fox to WSYX subchannel ===
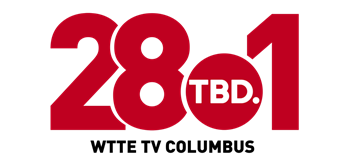
Logo used from 2021 to 2025.

On January 1, 2021, Sinclair quietly sent a letter to cable and satellite providers saying that it had consolidated the Fox affiliations of stations in five markets where it had been on a station operated via an LMA onto Sinclair-owned stations, putting those affiliations directly in Sinclair's control. WTTE was one of the affected stations. While most markets transitioned on that day, the transition of WTTE–Fox's programming schedule onto WSYX's spectrum took place on January 7, the day WWHO-TV became the market's ATSC 3.0 lighthouse station. On that date, Fox 28 moved to WSYX 6.3. It was broadcast from both WSYX and WTTE until February 3, when WTTE's main signal switched to the Sinclair-owned TBD network.

== Technical information ==
=== Subchannels ===
WTTE's transmitter is located in the Franklinton section of Columbus. The station's signal is multiplexed:

Subchannels of WTTE
Subchannel	Res.	Short name	Programming
28.1	480i	WTTE	Roar
28.2	480i	Antenna	Antenna TV
28.3	480i	GetTV	Great
53.1	720p	WWHO-CW	The CW (WWHO)
53.2	480i	Charge!	Charge! (WWHO)

Broadcast on behalf of another station

=== Analog-to-digital conversion ===
WTTE began broadcasting a digital signal on October 28, 2002. It and WWHO were the only full-power television stations in the Columbus market that honored the original DTV transition date of February 17, 2009. The station's digital signal remained on its pre-transition UHF channel 36, using virtual channel 28.

WTTE relocated its signal from channel 36 to channel 27 on April 9, 2019, as a result of the 2016 United States wireless spectrum auction.

== See also ==
- Channel 27 digital TV stations in the United States
- Channel 28 virtual TV stations in the United States
