= WSYX =

Television station in Columbus, Ohio

- Columbus, Ohio; United States
- Channels: Digital: 28 (UHF); Virtual: 6
- Branding: ABC 6; MyTV Columbus (6.2); Fox 28 (6.3)

Programming
- Affiliations: 6.1: ABC; 6.3: Fox; for others, see § Subchannels

Ownership
- Owner: Sinclair Broadcast Group; (WSYX Licensee, Inc.)
- Sister stations: WTTE, WWHO

History
- Founded: March 1948
- First air date: September 29, 1949
- Former call signs: WTVN(-TV) (1949–1987)
- Former channel numbers: Analog: 6 (VHF, 1949–2009); Digital: 13 (VHF, 2001–2010), 48 (UHF, 2010–2019)
- Former affiliations: DuMont (1949–1955); ABC (secondary, 1949–1955)
- Call sign meaning: homophone for "six"

Technical information
- Licensing authority: FCC
- Facility ID: 56549
- ERP: 677 kW
- HAAT: 286 m (938 ft)
- Transmitter coordinates: 39°56′14″N 83°1′16″W

Links
- Public license information: Public file; LMS
- Website: abc6onyourside.com; myfox28columbus.com (6.3)

WSYX (channel 6) is a television station in Columbus, Ohio, United States, affiliated with ABC, MyNetworkTV and Fox. It is owned by Sinclair Broadcast Group alongside CW affiliate WWHO (channel 53) and operated with WTTE (channel 28). The three stations share studios on Dublin Road, northwest of downtown Columbus; WSYX's transmitter is located in the Franklinton section of the city.

== History ==
The station began operations on September 29, 1949, as WTVN, Columbus's second television station. At its launch, the station was owned by Picture Waves Inc., a company controlled by Toledo-based attorney and investor Edward Lamb; Lamb also owned WICU-TV in Erie, Pennsylvania, which went on the air six months earlier. WTVN was an affiliate of the DuMont Television Network at its inception, and was one of only three primary affiliates of that network; it also carried a secondary affiliation with ABC. Channel 6 became a full-time ABC affiliate in 1955, after DuMont closed down its operations. During the late 1950s, the station was also briefly affiliated with the NTA Film Network. The station was first housed within the Lincoln-LeVeque Tower in Downtown Columbus until 1952, when it moved into a new facility on Harmon Avenue in Franklinton. Channel 6's present home, on Dublin Road near the Columbus–Grandview Heights border, has been in operation since 1978.

In March 1953, Picture Waves sold WTVN to Radio Cincinnati, Inc., the broadcasting interests of the Taft family of Cincinnati. The following year, Radio Cincinnati purchased WHKC radio (610 AM) in Columbus from the publishers of the Cleveland Plain Dealer, renaming that station WTVN (AM) and subsequently adding a "-TV" suffix to channel 6's call sign. Radio Cincinnati would later become the Taft Broadcasting Company, and Taft would launch a second radio station in Columbus, WTVN-FM (96.3 FM, now WLVQ), in April 1960.

In the early 1970s, Taft's common ownership of WTVN-TV and WKRC-TV (channel 12) in Cincinnati was given protection under a "grandfather clause" by the Federal Communications Commission (FCC) from its newly enacted "one-to-a-market" rule. The ordinance prohibited television stations with overlapping signals from sharing common ownership while protecting existing instances. WKRC-TV's signal provided at least secondary coverage to much of the southern portion of the Columbus market. One of WTVN-TV's competitors, Crosley/Avco-owned WLWC (channel 4, now WCMH-TV), was given grandfathered protection through a similar situation with sister stations in Dayton and Cincinnati.

In 1987, Cincinnati financier (and future Cincinnati Reds owner) Carl Lindner acquired a majority of Taft's shares in a hostile takeover, renaming the company Great American Broadcasting, a subsidiary of his Great American Insurance Company. The manner in which the takeover was structured led the FCC to deem it to be an ownership change. As a result, WTVN-TV lost its grandfathered protection and could not be retained by Great American. A group of former Taft Broadcasting shareholders, led by Texas millionaire Robert Bass (who also participated in the hostile takeover), purchased WTVN-TV for their new company, called Anchor Media. The sale closed on August 31, 1987, and the new owners renamed the station WSYX that same day. The change was required as FCC rules at the time prohibited TV and radio stations with separate ownership in the same market from retaining the same base callsign. WTVN and WLVQ remained owned by Great American for several years.

Anchor Media, who also purchased ABC affiliates WLOS in Asheville, North Carolina (in April 1987) and KOVR in Stockton, California (in January 1989), was purchased by River City Broadcasting in 1993. River City was merged into the Sinclair Broadcast Group in 1996. Sinclair owned Columbus' Fox affiliate, WTTE, but could not keep both stations since the FCC did not allow common ownership of two stations in a single market. Sinclair kept the longer-established WSYX and sold WTTE to Glencairn, Ltd., owned by former Sinclair executive Edwin Edwards. However, the Smith family (Sinclair's founding owners) controlled nearly all of Glencairn's stock. In effect, Sinclair now had a duopoly in Columbus in violation of FCC rules. Sinclair and Glenciarn further circumvented the rules by merging WTTE's operations with those of WSYX under a local marketing agreement, with WSYX as the senior partner.

In 2001, after the FCC allowed duopolies, Sinclair tried to acquire Glencairn outright. However, the FCC would not allow Sinclair to repurchase WTTE for two major reasons. First, the FCC did not allow duopolies between two of the four highest-rated stations in a single market. Also, the Columbus market, despite its relatively large size, has only seven full-power stations—too few at the time to legally permit a duopoly. Glencairn was renamed Cunningham Broadcasting but is still effectively owned by Sinclair because nearly all of its stock is owned by trusts controlled by the Smith family. This situation is one of many that has led to allegations that Cunningham is simply a shell corporation used by Sinclair to circumvent FCC ownership rules. Sinclair would later acquire WKRC-TV in 2012, reuniting the station with WSYX.

In 2004, WSYX (along with other ABC affiliates owned by Sinclair, including sister stations WKEF in Dayton [which had recently switched back to ABC from NBC] as well as WCHS-TV which includes parts of Southern Ohio in its viewing area) preempted the special showing of Saving Private Ryan in late 2004 due to concerns that the FCC would impose a fine on them if they had aired the World War II-set movie due to the Super Bowl XXXVIII halftime show controversy earlier that year. As ABC affiliates owned by the E. W. Scripps Company also preempted the film (including WEWS-TV in Cleveland and WCPO-TV in Cincinnati), only viewers in the far eastern (WYTV) and northwestern (then-ABC O&O WTVG in Toledo) parts of Ohio were able to view the film. It was later determined that the movie's broadcast was not a violation of FCC regulations.

At one point, WTVN-TV/WSYX was one of five ABC affiliates owned by Taft, owing to a longtime friendship between Taft's chairman Hulbert Taft Jr., and then-ABC president Leonard Goldenson. WSYX is the only one of these stations still affiliated with ABC, the only former Taft station whose ABC affiliation survives that friendship. Following the sale of WCMH-TV by NBC to Media General in 2006 (as well as its subsequent merger with Nexstar Media Group in 2017) as well as WBNS-TV's 2019 sale to Tegna Inc., WSYX currently has the longest active ownership history with one owner among Columbus's "Big Three" affiliates.

=== Addition of Fox affiliation ===
On January 1, 2021, Sinclair quietly sent a letter to cable and satellite providers saying that it had consolidated the Fox affiliations of stations in markets where it had been on a sister Cunningham or Deerfield-owned station onto Sinclair owned stations, putting those affiliations directly in Sinclair's control. While most markets transitioned on that day, the transition of WTTE-DT1's programming schedule onto WSYX's spectrum would be held off until January 7, as that would be the day WWHO would convert to being the market's ATSC 3.0 lighthouse station, and it would be easier for the transition of all the channels being moved or launched to occur then.

On that day, Sinclair began simulcasting "Fox 28" programming on WSYX-DT3, while moving Antenna TV to the newly created 6.4. WTTE's main signal would eventually carry Sinclair-owned TBD full-time. The simulcast continued until February 3 at 10 a.m., when the "Fox 28" schedule was now only available over-the-air through WSYX-DT3 (WTTE would also become the host of WWHO's main CW schedule in ATSC 1.0 format).

With the move of the "Fox 28" schedule to WSYX-DT3, it became the largest-market subchannel-only Fox affiliate, surpassing Albuquerque, New Mexico's KRQE-DT2 for that distinction, along with the largest station by market size holding two affiliations with the Big Four networks (also ahead of KRQE), though it was surpassed in August 2025 when Fox affiliate WSVN in Miami added the ABC affiliation to its second digital subchannel, replacing decades-long affiliate WPLG. WSYX-DT3 continues to identify as "Fox 28" outside of the change of the call letters for their station identification, though in technicality as WSYX uses physical channel 28, it still properly identifies its channel position.

The switch was contractually proper for cable and satellite providers, who continue to carry Fox programming on all of "Fox 28"'s existing low-number channel positions, while WTTE-DT1's carriage now depends on provider; some carry it as a low-number channel, while others no longer carry any of WTTE's channels.

In April 2021, Antenna TV and Stadium swapped channels, with Stadium moving to 6.4 and Antenna TV moving to WTTE-DT2.

=== WSYX-DT2 ===
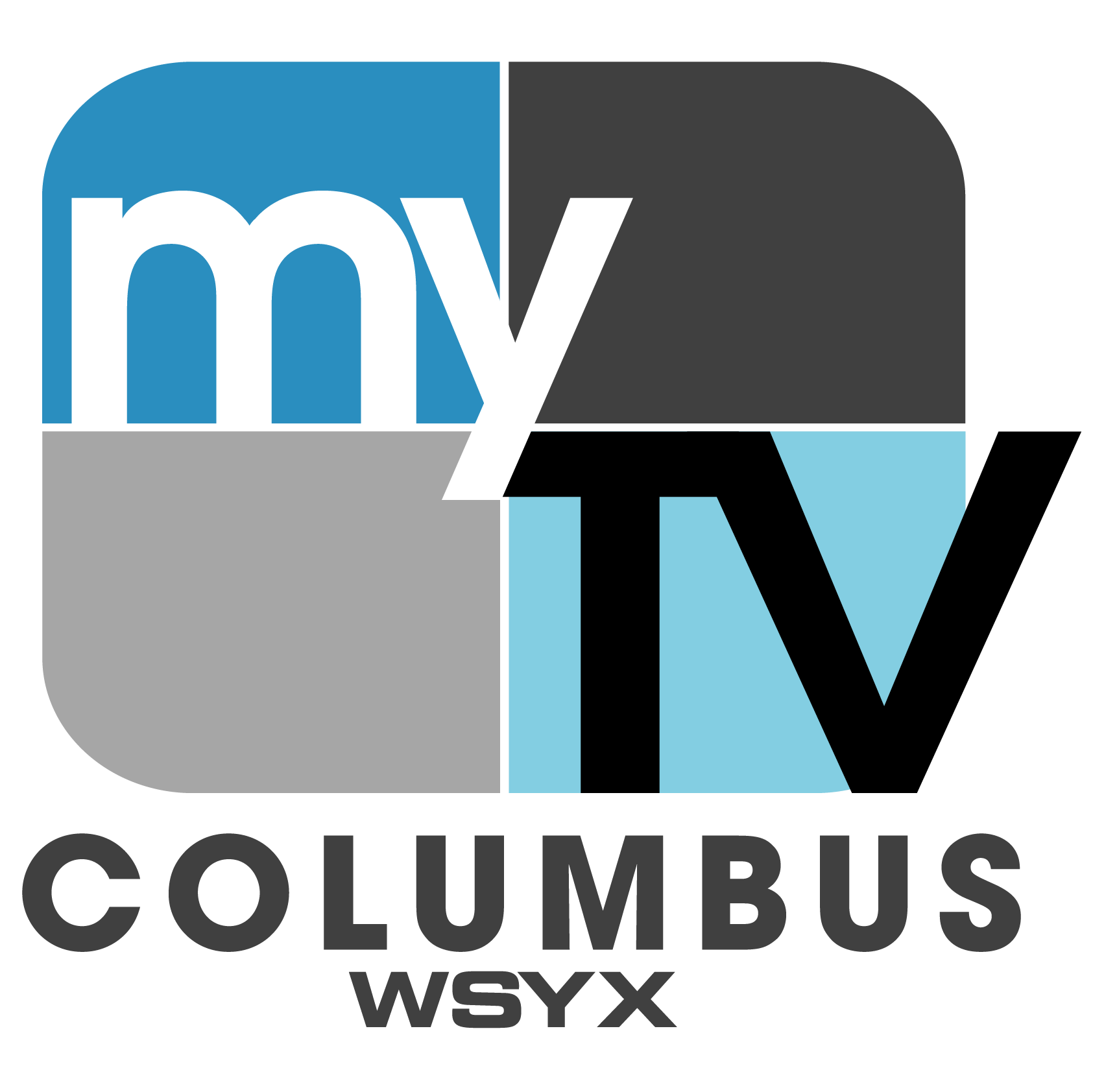
WSYX-DT2 logo

In August 2006, WSYX launched a new second digital subchannel to carry programming from MyNetworkTV. This channel added programming from This TV in the daytime and overnight hours on November 1, 2008; eventually it took up a bulk of the schedule outside of MyNetworkTV programming. For a long time, WSYX-DT2 had been the largest-market subchannel-only MyNetworkTV affiliate, but that all changed on November 17, 2014, when KMOV-DT3 "MyTV St. Louis" signed on. However, WSYX-DT2 remained the largest-market MyNetworkTV affiliate to be paired with another multicast digital network, until January 29, 2019, when the Cleveland market's MyNetworkTV affiliation was transferred from WUAB (which relaunched as a CW-affiliated station) to a late-night offering with MeTV on WOIO-DT2.

== Programming ==
=== News operation ===
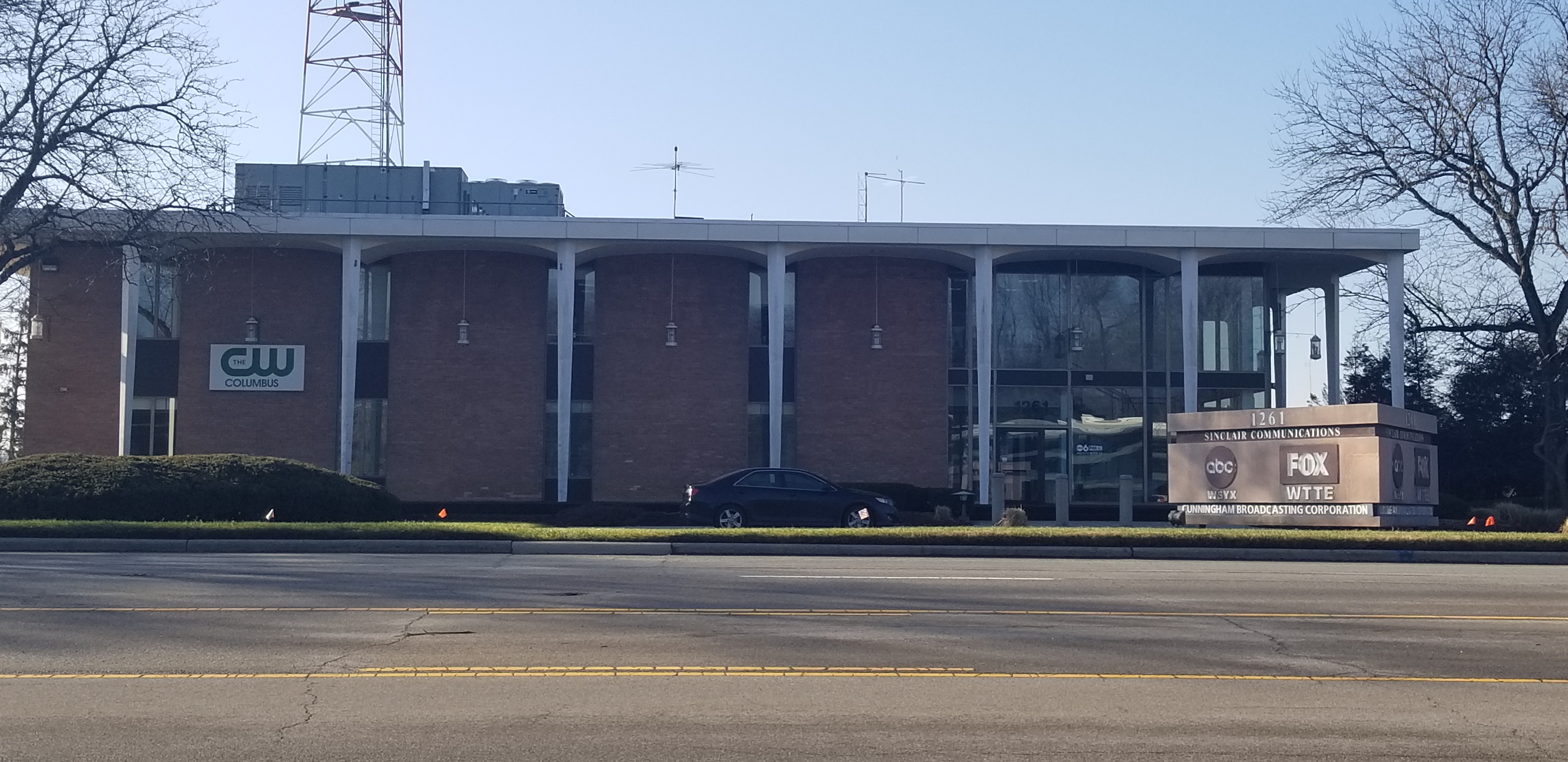
WSYX/WTTE/WWHO studios in Columbus.

WSYX presently broadcasts 38 hours of locally produced newscasts each week (with six hours each weekday and four hours each on Saturdays and Sundays) on its main signal, as well as 25 1/2 hours on WSYX-DT3 (with five hours each weekday, three hours on Saturdays, and 2 1/2 hours on Sundays) for a total of 63 1/2 hours of locally produced newscasts; in regards to the number of hours devoted to news programming, it is the highest local newscast output among the Columbus market's television stations, though WCMH-TV has the largest output airing on one channel.

Historically, WSYX had been third among Columbus's television news operations, with WBNS the longtime market leader and WCMH having NBC's strength in the 1980s into the 2000s (and NBC ownership in-between) to keep up with WBNS. WSYX has begun to challenge WBNS as Sinclair's ownership has become steady, with WCMH ending up a low-priority station under several new ownerships, and WBNS's local ownership ending in 2019 when the Wolfe family sold off the WBNS stations to Tegna, itself troubled by cost-cutting and shareholder turbulence and forced corporate-wide news imaging that discounted WBNS's local legacy. While WCMH-TV generally carries a straight newscast (as is common among Nexstar stations) and WBNS-TV has been more lifestyle-oriented under Tegna ownership, WSYX has traditionally had more of a watchdog journalism style, long carrying the slogan "On YOUR Side". Since the sale of WBNS-TV to Tegna, WSYX has been in a neck-and-neck race with WCMH-TV as the market leader, dominating in the mornings while being more competitive in other timeslots.

During the 1977–83 era, WTVN-TV often passed WCMH for second place behind WBNS, and during 1987–1992, WSYX and WBNS traded second place ratings, both behind then-number one WCMH. Over the years, the station has featured high-profile Columbus anchors including Tom Ryan (who moved from WBNS to WTVN in 1979), Pat Lalama, I. J. Hudson, Michelle Gailiun, Lou Forrest (known as Louis de la Foret on CNN Headline News), Deborah Countiss, Bob Hetherington, Charlene Brown, and Liz Claman (now an anchor on Fox Business Network) and Carol Costello (former CNN news anchor) were also one time anchor/reporters on WSYX.

Prior to Sinclair's acquisition of WSYX, channel 6 used the Action News branding for its newscasts. Following its acquisition, WSYX began to produce newscasts for new sister station WTTE and used the unified branding of News Center. This would be dropped in 2006, with the two stations now using their individual station branding for newscasts, though outside the branding it was established that they were sister stations and used the same on-air talent and reporters.

WSYX and WTTE did not participate in the wider implementation of Sinclair's now-defunct, controversial News Central format for its newscasts but did air The Point, a one-minute conservative political commentary, that was also controversial and a requirement of all Sinclair-owned stations with newscasts until the series was discontinued in December 2006. WSYX had previously provided weather forecasts to sister St. Louis ABC affiliate KDNL-TV for their Good Morning America cut-ins, and does so during the Sinclair-produced The National Desk for Midwestern areas. WSYX launched their newscasts in high definition on May 10, 2008, making them the last Columbus station to make the upgrade. The WTTE newscasts were included in the switch. In addition, this was the second Sinclair-owned station to launch local newscasts in HD.

WSYX was one of Sinclair's first stations it acquired with an established news department, with the company having only dabbled with local news at WPTT in Pittsburgh (now WPNT) and flagship station WBFF in Baltimore prior to buying River City Broadcasting, though it had just launched a 10 p.m. newscast for its other Pittsburgh broadcast property WPGH-TV around the time it took over WSYX. (Those newscasts are now produced by Cox Media Group-owned NBC affiliate WPXI in that market.) As a result, aside from the branding changes, WSYX's newscasts were largely left alone; this is in stark contrast to later acquisitions including WKRC-TV that lined up the newscasts with Sinclair's conservative Republican ideologies and to this day rarely carry Sinclair's must-run programming.

=== Live programming ===
Like most local stations during the "Golden Era" of television, WTVN-TV produced a wide range of live local news and entertainment programs. Earl Green, better known as Channel 6's news anchor and director in the 1970s, began his career at the station as a movie host; Gene Fullen and Sally Flowers also hosted shows during their careers. WTVN-TV also hosted various live bowling shows including Bowling for Dollars and Spare Time hosted by Gene Fullen and Sandy Hare from its in-studio bowling lanes at the Harmon Avenue studios. The bowling lanes were not relocated when WTVN-TV moved to its current studio facility at 1261 Dublin Road in 1977.

For a short time in 1988, WSYX-TV aired the first-ever locally produced 10 a.m. live morning talk-entertainment show in Columbus, appropriately called Good Morning Columbus. The half-hour show was hosted by Calvin Sneed, the station's "Six On Your Side" consumer reporter, and Dawn Meadows, formerly of WEWS-TV, Cleveland.

=== Sports ===
Through its affiliation with Fox and its Big Ten Conference rights, WSYX-DT3 airs select Ohio State Buckeyes football games, which are a huge ratings draw in Ohio in general and specifically Columbus, home of Ohio State University. The station notably aired the Buckeyes' national championship victory in 2002. WSYX airs pre-game and post-game shows throughout football season on both 6.1 and 6.3. Despite that, WBNS-TV is considered the official "home" station due to its longstanding relationship with Ohio State, and WBNS-TV instead of WSYX airs coach's shows for the Buckeyes.

After Sinclair's 2019 purchase of the former Fox Sports Networks and subsequent conversion into Bally Sports, WSYX actively promoted now-defunct sister network Bally Sports Ohio as the home of the Columbus Blue Jackets and Columbus Crew SC, mentioning to viewers during its newscasts when their respective games air on Bally Sports Ohio.

=== Tri-State Network ===
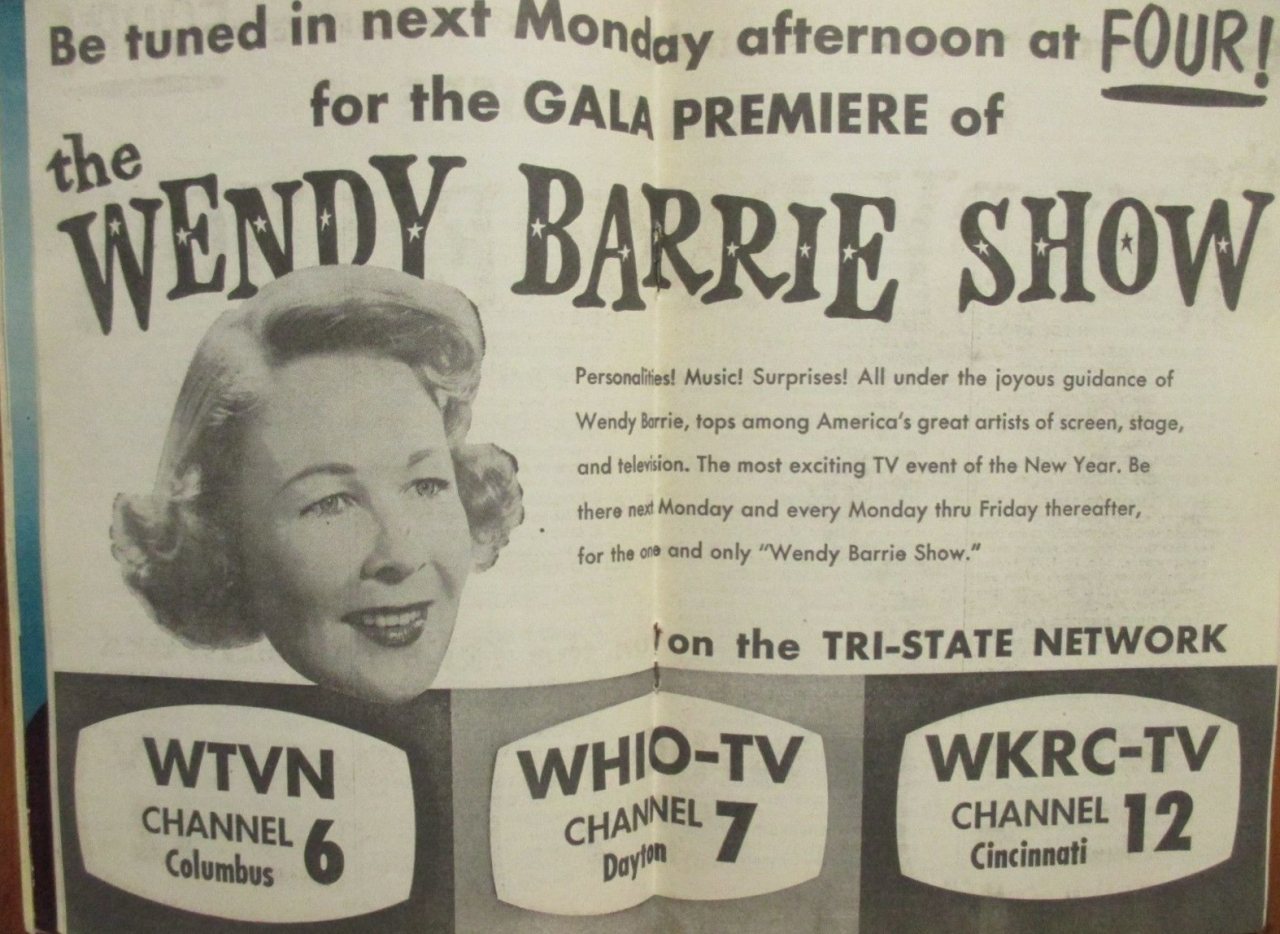
Advertisement for the Premiere of The Wendy Barrie Show originating from WHIO-TV in Dayton and simulcast on WKRC-TV in Cincinnati and WTVN (now WSYX) in Columbus, all in Ohio

In 1953, three television stations owned by Taft Broadcasting Company and Cox Media Group formed the short-lived "Tri-State Network" to compete with entertainment programming produced by Crosley Broadcasting Corporation on Crosley television stations in the Cincinnati, Columbus and Dayton broadcast markets. On January 11, 1954, a new Wendy Barrie Show premiered from the studios of WHIO-TV in Dayton, simulcast on Taft Broadcasting's WKRC-TV in Cincinnati and WTVN (now WSYX) in Columbus. Barrie's contract was terminated in October 1954.

=== Notable former on-air staff ===
- Donna Hanover – former wife of Rudy Giuliani
- Pat LaLama
- Carol Costello
- Liz Claman
- Mike Bettes

== Technical information ==
=== Subchannels ===
The station's signal is multiplexed:

Subchannels of WSYX
Subchannel	Res.	Short name	Programming
6.1	720p	WSYXABC	ABC
6.2	480i	MyTV	The Nest/MyNetworkTV
6.3	720p	Fox28	Fox
6.4	480i	TheNest	The Nest

=== Analog-to-digital conversion ===
WSYX ended regular programming on its analog signal, over VHF channel 6, on June 12, 2009, at 11:59 p.m., as part of the federally mandated transition from analog to digital television. The station's digital signal remained on its pre-transition VHF channel 13, using virtual channel 6. On December 11, 2009, the FCC issued a Report & Order granting WSYX's petition to move from VHF channel 13 to UHF channel 48 to improve signal strength and to be consistent with other Columbus stations on the UHF dial. On August 30, 2010, WSYX began broadcasting on UHF channel 48. Like all stations broadcasting on channel 6 prior to the digital switchover, WSYX's audio signal could be heard on 87.75 MHz on the FM band in Columbus and the surrounding areas.

As part of the SAFER Act, WSYX kept its analog signal on the air until June 26 to inform viewers of the digital television transition through a loop of public service announcements from the National Association of Broadcasters.

WSYX moved its digital signal from channel 48 to channel 28 on October 19, 2019, as part of the FCC's spectrum reallocation process.

== Out of market coverage ==
At times, WTVN-TV/WSYX has served as the default ABC affiliate in several markets. This has included the Zanesville market as a whole (which only has NBC/Fox affiliate WHIZ-TV), the Lima market as a whole (served by NBC affiliate WLIO), the Ohio portion of the Marietta–Parkersburg market (served by NBC affiliate WTAP-TV), and the western parts of the Wheeling–Steubenville market (served by WTRF-TV and WTOV-TV).

Over-the-air ABC coverage in Marietta–Parkersburg remains absent even as WTAP-TV owners Gray Television have signed on low-powered stations that air the other networks (Fox affiliate WOVA-LD and CBS affiliate WIYE-LD), so WSYX and sister station WCHS-TV in Charleston, West Virginia, both serve as default affiliates, with WSYX serving the Ohio side of the market.

In Wheeling–Steubenville, WSYX covered areas that couldn't receive WTAE-TV from Pittsburgh, which served as the de facto affiliate in most of that market, since it had to short-space its analog signal to protect WCMH-TV; some viewers in the market are also able to receive WYTV in Youngstown. This gave viewers in the Wheeling–Steubenville market an option to watch ABC programming in pattern, since the only stations in the market (WTRF-TV and WSTV-TV/WTOV-TV) aired ABC programming only in the off-hours, and largely dropped them altogether by the 1980s. (WTOV-TV is now a sister station to WSYX.) That market finally received its own full-time ABC affiliate in 2008, when WTRF-TV launched one on its third digital subchannel, although WSYX remains available on cable in the western parts of the market.

Until 1980, channel 6 was the closest VHF-signaled ABC affiliate to Lima, as the UHF-signaled WKEF in Dayton and WDHO-TV in Toledo (now WNWO-TV) were both too weak to reach Lima. (Both are now sister stations to WSYX.) However, that year WDTN swapped affiliations with WKEF due to WKEF's weak signal even in Dayton as well as multiple preemptions by that station. (Both stations would reverse the swap in 2004.) WDTN's affiliation with ABC lessened the need for channel 6 to air in Lima, as the channel 2 signal traveled greater distances in the analog era. Channel 6's importance lessened even more when WTVG swapped affiliations with WNWO-TV in 1995 as part of the 1994–96 United States broadcast television realignment, which didn't impact Columbus at all. Today, Lima has its own ABC affiliate on low-powered WOHL-CD, owned and operated by WLIO parent Block Communications.

Unlike the other three markets, WHIZ-TV has not signed on low-powered stations or made use of its subchannels to launch ABC or CBS affiliates (only adding Fox and MyNetworkTV programming to its DT2 subchannel on November 14, 2022, with Cozi TV on DT3). As a result, WSYX continues to serve as the ABC affiliate of record for the Zanesville market, as it did for Fox from 2021 until WHIZ-TV launched its Fox subchannel.

== See also ==
- Channel 6 virtual TV stations in the United States
- Channel 28 branded TV stations in the United States
- Channel 28 digital TV stations in the United States
