= WCMH-TV =

Television station in Columbus, Ohio

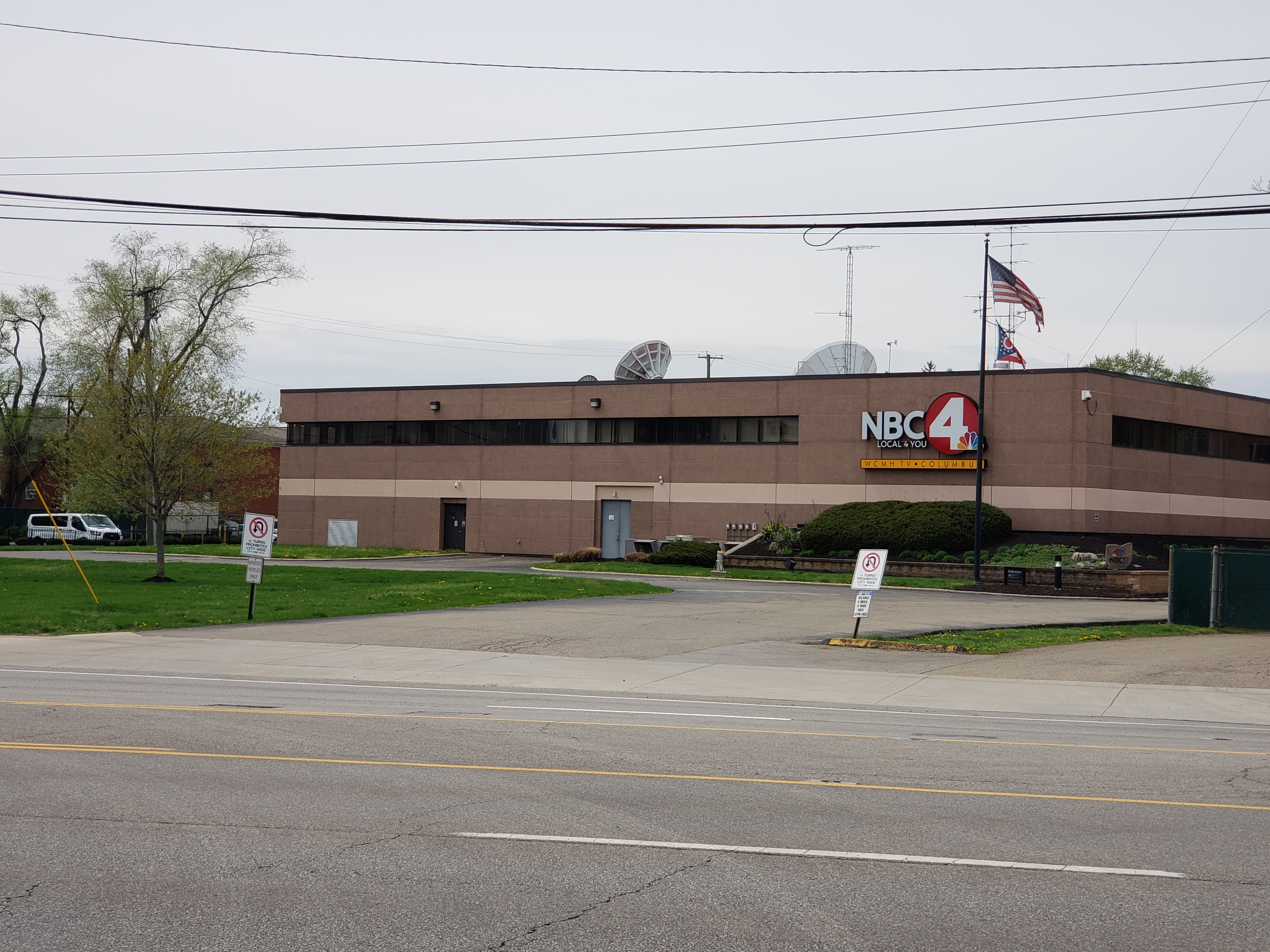
- WCMH-TV's studios in 2021.
- Columbus, Ohio; United States
- Channels: Digital: 14 (UHF); Virtual: 4
- Branding: NBC 4

Programming
- Affiliations: 4.1: NBC; for others, see § Subchannels

Ownership
- Owner: Nexstar Media Group; (Nexstar Media Inc.)
- Sister stations: Tegna: WBNS, WBNS-FM, WBNS-TV

History
- Founded: November 21, 1946
- First air date: April 3, 1949
- Former call signs: WLWX (1946–1947); WLWC (1947–1976)
- Former channel numbers: Analog: 3 (VHF, 1949–1953), 4 (VHF, 1953–2009)
- Call sign meaning: Columbus Municipal Hangar ("CMH" is Columbus's IATA airport code)

Technical information
- Licensing authority: FCC
- Facility ID: 50781
- ERP: 902 kW
- HAAT: 264 m (866 ft)
- Transmitter coordinates: 39°58′15.5″N 83°1′39.2″W

Links
- Public license information: Public file; LMS
- Website: www.nbc4i.com

WCMH-TV (channel 4) is a television station in Columbus, Ohio, United States, affiliated with NBC. It is owned by Nexstar Media Group, whose Tegna subsidiary owns CBS affiliate WBNS-TV (channel 10) and two radio stations, WBNS (1460 AM) and WBNS-FM (97.1). WCMH-TV's studios are located on Olentangy River Road near the Ohio State University campus, and its transmitter is located on Twin Rivers Drive, west of downtown Columbus.

== History ==
The first television station in Columbus, Ohio, began operations on April 3, 1949, as WLWC on channel 3. The station's original owner was the Cincinnati-based Crosley Broadcasting Corporation, a division of the Avco Company. Crosley also owned WLW radio and WLWT in Cincinnati, as well as WLWD in Dayton. Together these stations comprised the "WLW Television Network", a regional group of inter-connected stations. Until the mid-1960s, the stations emphasized their connection to each other within their on-air branding; the Columbus station was known as "WLW-C". The station's studios were originally located in the Seneca Hotel in downtown Columbus before WLWC moved into their present facility on Olentangy River Road, five months after the station signed on.

Like all of the WLW television stations in Ohio, WLWC was an NBC affiliate, though it carried some programming from the DuMont network until WTVN-TV (now WSYX) took the DuMont affiliation when that station launched in September 1949. In 1952, following the release of the Federal Communications Commission (FCC)'s Sixth Report and Order which ended the four-year freeze on station license awards, a VHF frequency realignment resulted in WLWC being forced to move to channel 4, trading channels with then-NBC-owned WNBK in Cleveland; the switch took place in June 1953.

The Crosley TV station group would later grow to include WLWA in Atlanta, WLWI in Indianapolis, and WOAI-TV in San Antonio. Along with NBC programming, the Crosley stations in Ohio and Indianapolis also aired common programming, including The Paul Dixon Show, Midwestern Hayride, The Ruth Lyons 50-50 Club (later to become The Bob Braun Show), The Phil Donahue Show, and telecasts of Cincinnati Reds baseball; WLWC originated coverage of the Ohio State Fair, which was also carried in Cincinnati and Dayton. The Crosley broadcast division took the name of its parent company in 1968, becoming Avco Broadcasting Corporation.

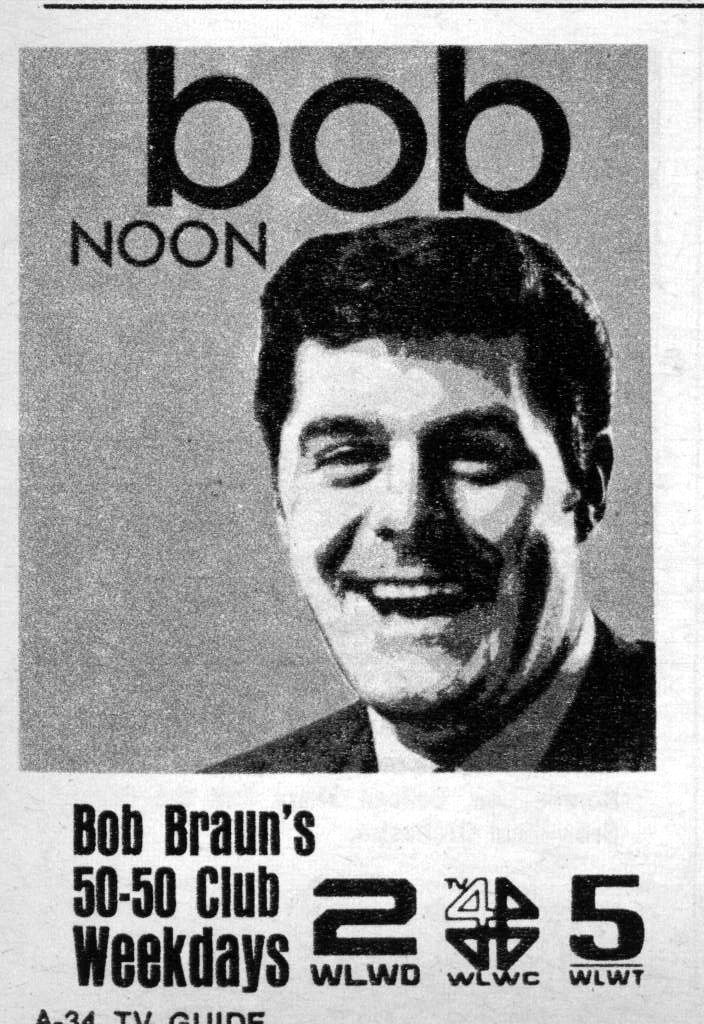
1969 Advertisement for The Bob Braun Show appearing in TV Guide.

In 1969, the FCC enacted its "one-to-a-market" rule, which prohibited common ownership of AM radio and television stations with overlapping coverage areas under certain conditions while grandfathering some already existing instances. Avco's ownership of WLWC, WLWT, WLWD, and WLW radio (a 50,000-watt, clear-channel station which can also be heard throughout much of eastern North America at night) was granted protection under the clause. But as a condition of maintaining three television stations with common coverage areas Crosley/Avco operated WLWC, WLWT, and WLWD with shorter transmission towers. In 1975, Avco announced the sale of its broadcasting outlets; channel 4 was sold in February 1976 to the Providence, Rhode Island–based Outlet Company, who then changed the station's call letters to WCMH-TV on February 3. The call letters were selected to match the IATA airport code for what is now John Glenn Columbus International Airport, "CMH".

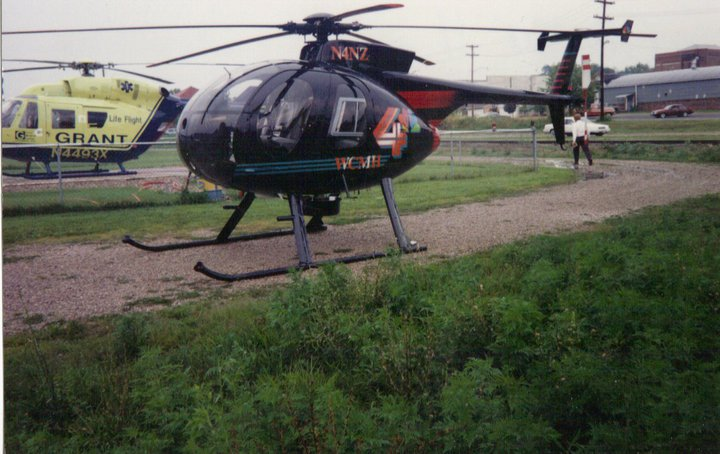
The old WCMH TV "Chopper 4" landed at Wellston Heliport Base while covering a breaking news story, as Grant Lifeflight II's BK 117 N4493X sits nearby

WCMH-TV logo, 2008 to 2011.

For many years, WLWC/WCMH-TV has shared NBC programming in the eastern part of the market with WHIZ-TV (channel 18) in Zanesville despite channel 4 itself covering Zanesville and covering weather reports as far east as Cambridge (part of the Wheeling, West Virginia–Steubenville, Ohio, market and served by WTOV-TV for NBC) and all other major network affiliates in Columbus covering Muskingum County as default affiliates, since Zanesville is considered a separate TV market from Columbus. WHIZ-TV would also serve somewhat as a buffer for WCMH-TV after WTAE-TV in Pittsburgh signed on in 1958 and had to "box in" its signal to protect then-WLWC and three other stations also broadcasting on channel 4.

Outlet merged with NBC in 1996, and channel 4 became an NBC owned-and-operated station, spending much of the next decade as one of two stations in the market to hold this status; the other was UPN's WWHO, (channel 53, owned by that network's corporate parent Viacom from 1997 to 2005).

NBCUniversal placed WCMH-TV on the market January 9, 2006, along with sister stations WJAR in Providence, WVTM-TV in Birmingham, Alabama, and WNCN-TV in Goldsboro, North Carolina. Media General, the Richmond, Virginia-based company which already owned five NBC affiliates in the southeastern United States, announced it would purchase the four stations on April 6, 2006; the sale was finalized on June 26, 2006. As a result, channel 4 became Media General's first station in the Great Lakes region. Media General would locate the master control for all its NBC affiliates at WCMH-TV.

On January 27, 2016, Nexstar Broadcasting Group announced it would buy Media General for $4.6 billion. WCMH became part of Nexstar Media Group when the deal closed on January 17, 2017.

On August 19, 2025, Nexstar announced its acquistion of Tegna Inc. In Columbus, Tegna owns WBNS, WBNS-FM, and WBNS-TV. The deal was completed on March 19, 2026. A temporary restraining order issued one week later by the U.S. District Court for the Eastern District of California, later escalated to a preliminary injunction, has prevented the WBNS stations from being integrated into WCMH. Ohio Attorney General Dave Yost reached a deal with Nexstar on April 30, 2026, under which, if the injunction were to be lifted, Nexstar would maintain the existing local program output and editorially independent news departments between WBNS and WCMH through 2030.

== News operation ==
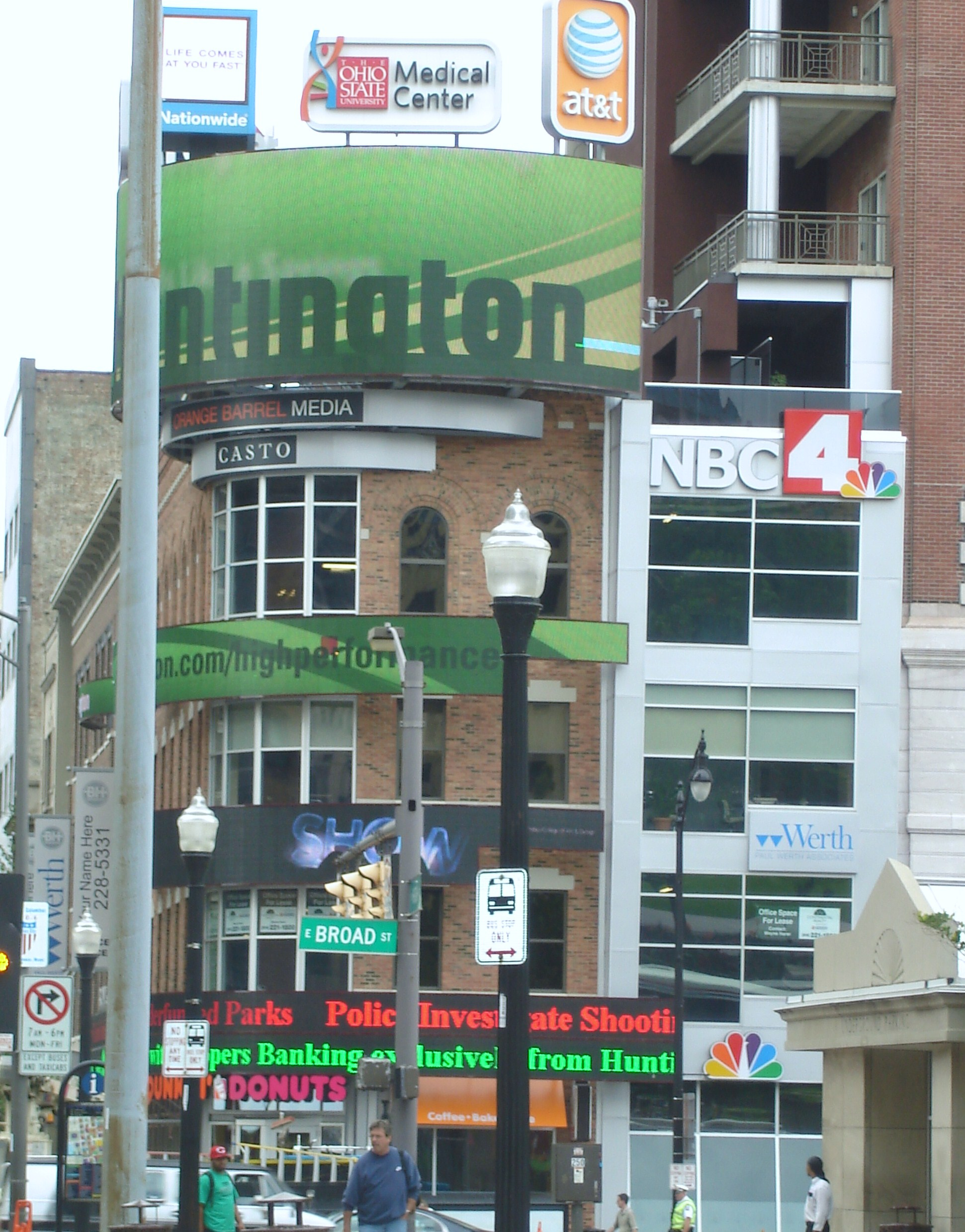
WCMH-TV's former studio in downtown Columbus, at the northeast corner of Broad and High streets.

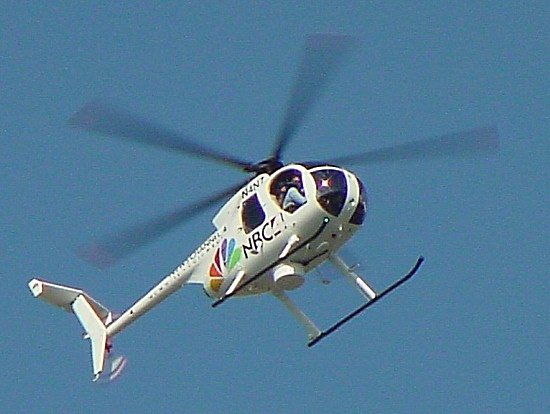
WCMH's former helicopter.

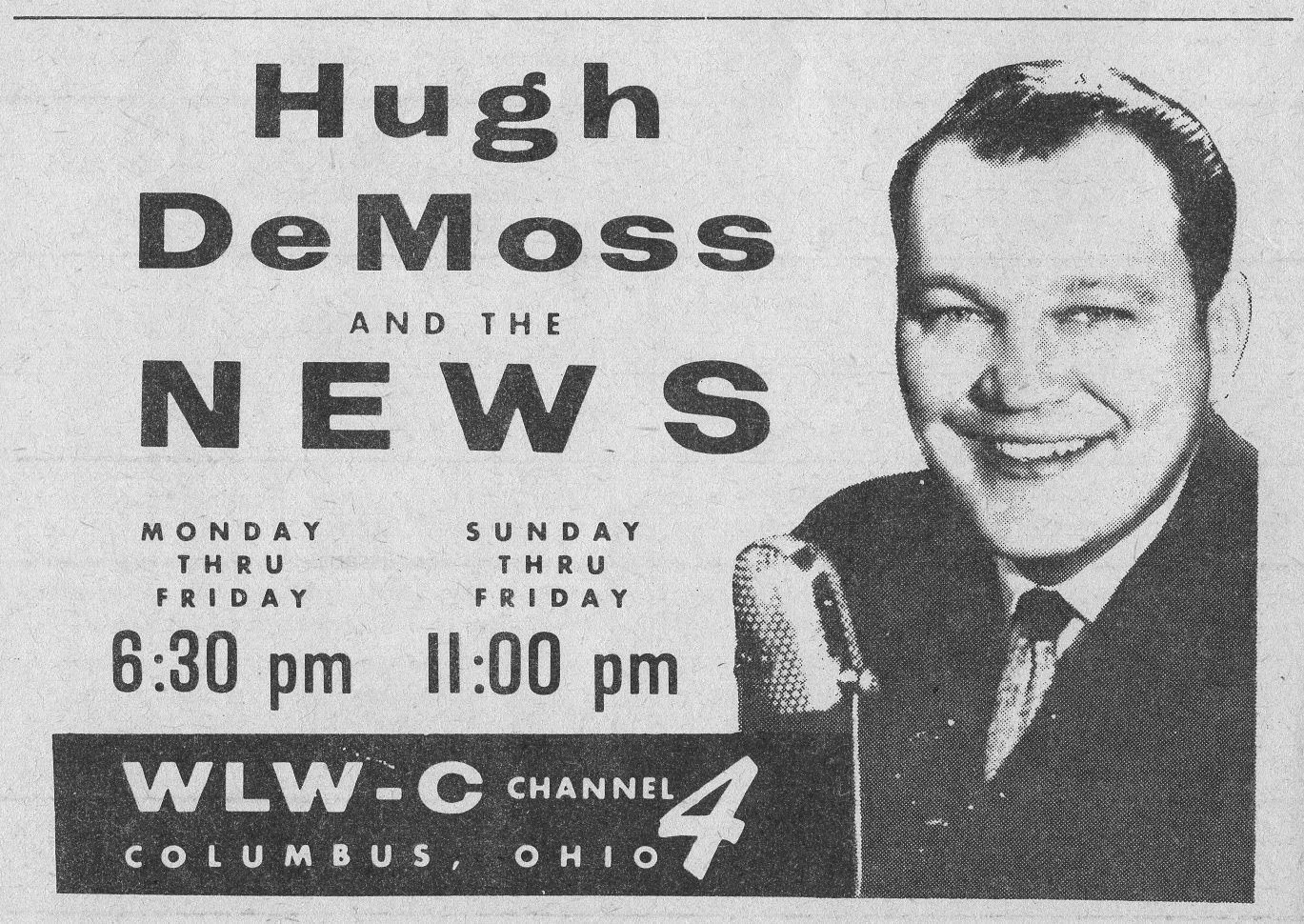
1957 TV Guide Advertisement for WLW-C (WCMH) News with longtime anchor Hugh DeMoss, later Franklin County, Ohio Commissioner.

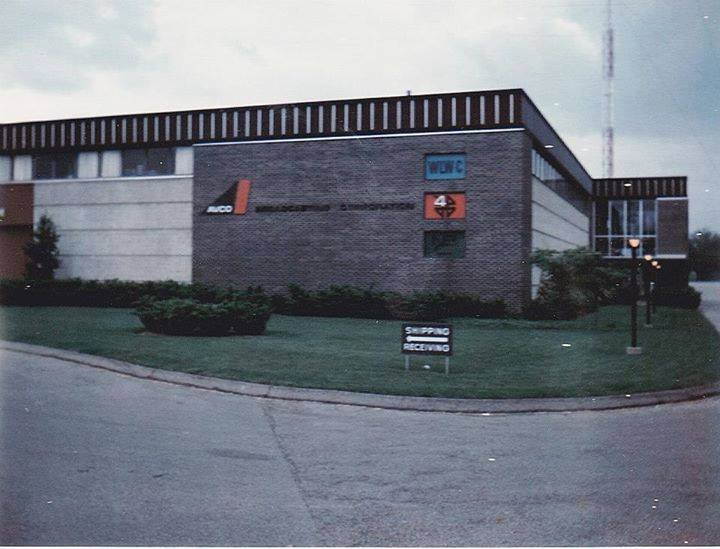
WLWC's studio building, 3165 Olentangy River Road in Columbus, under Avco ownership in the 1960s. The station's transmitter and tower were also located here, until they were moved to WBNS-TV's then-new candelabra tower in the early 1980s.

WCMH presently broadcasts 49 hours of locally produced newscasts each week (with eight hours each weekday, five hours on Saturdays and four hours on Sundays); in regards to the number of hours devoted to news programming, it is the highest local newscast output among the Columbus market's television stations on an individual basis, though WSYX currently broadcasts 63 1/2 hours of local newscasts per week on both its main signal and WSYX-DT3.

For most of its history, WLWC/WCMH-TV has been second in the Columbus ratings, except for the station's 11 p.m. news, which occasionally beats market leader WBNS-TV, though since WBNS-TV's sale to Tegna, Inc. in 2019, WCMH has been second behind WSYX, with WBNS-TV's ratings having plummeted. Typical with Nexstar-owned stations, WCMH-TV generally carries a straight newscast with emphasis on local coverage; WBNS-TV drifted away from such coverage and more towards lifestyle news under Tegna ownership while WSYX has long favored a more activist-style approach. Channel 4 has also emphasized community involvement and reporters with local roots such as current evening anchor Kerry Charles, a native of Columbus's Linden neighborhood.

From 1957 to 1980 Hugh DeMoss anchored channel 4's evening newscasts, called The DeMoss Report; following the sale of the station to Outlet, the broadcasts were rebranded as NewsWatch 4. During the late 70s into the early 80s, the station languished in third place. But channel 4's fortunes began to change when, in 1983, the station hired veteran news anchor Doug Adair and his then-wife, reporter Mona Scott, from WKYC-TV in Cleveland as the station's main anchoring team. They continued the "happy talk" format as well as launching the 5:30 p.m. newscast. WCMH began a slow rise that would result in the station overcoming WBNS to reach number-one in the market, and in the process, the mid-1980s NewsWatch 4 team of Adair, Scott, meteorologist Jym Ganahl (with the station from 1979 until retiring in September 2016), and sportscaster Jimmy Crum (who joined the station shortly after its 1949 debut) became the most popular anchor team in Columbus television history. This also coincided with NBC's becoming the number one network during that time, including airing the Columbus-based sitcom Family Ties that would serve as the breakout vehicle for actor Michael J. Fox.

The 1990s brought changes to the normally stable WCMH-TV. In 1990, personal reasons forced Mona Scott to leave channel 4, and she was replaced at the anchor desk by Angela Pace. Pace would leave for WBNS-TV in 1992, and Doug Adair and Jimmy Crum both retired in 1994. WCMH's new anchoring team featured Colleen Marshall, who had been a reporter for the station since the mid-1980s; and Cabot Rea, a former weekend sports anchor and weekday features reporter. The pair helmed WCMH-TV's evening newscasts until Rea's retirement on December 18, 2015. Marshall and Rea worked together overall for 23 years, the longest tenured co-anchoring team in Columbus television history.

The changes resulted in an earlier audience fall-off, but channel 4 once again passed WBNS-TV for the overall lead for a time in the late 1990s and early 2000s, and often won 11 p.m. news ratings over WBNS (due to NBC winning prime time and late night ratings over CBS during those years). For much of the first decade of the new millennium, WCMH also won the morning news race, but the numbers dropped precipitously after the broadcast moved into NBC 4 on the Square, a downtown studio facility located on Broad and High streets, in 2008.

On January 4, 2008, WCMH became the second major Columbus station to begin broadcasting local newscasts in high definition. Prior to the opening of NBC 4 on the Square on May 27, channel 4 had planned to move its entire news operation to that facility. However, when those plans fell through, WCMH's main studio was upgraded to high definition. (Ultimately, NBC 4 on the Square was used only for some of the station's weekday morning shows.) Like most other stations with high-definition newscasts, WCMH relied mostly on upconverted 16:9 widescreen standard definition footage for its remote field reports until the summer of 2014 where all remote field operations were upgrade to 16:9 1080i HD. On May 11, 2011, NBC 4 on the Square came to an end due to dismal ratings (it has remained a distant second to WBNS-TV on weekday mornings ever since NBC4 on the Square was founded), with the morning newscast productions returning to the main WCMH facility full-time, and the downtown space was soon leased to WBNS-TV.

In January 2011, the station debuted a new rounded logo and new image promos emphasizing its long-time personalities and community involvement.

=== Notable current on-air staff ===
- Monica Day – morning news anchor of NBC 4 Today from 4 to 7 a.m.

=== Notable alumni ===
- Doug Adair (anchor, 1983–1994)
- Leon Bibb
- Diann Burns
- Nick Clooney – host of The Nick Clooney Show
- Bill Hindman – news anchor
- Brad Johansen – Midday (11 a.m.–12:30 p.m.) and 4 p.m. anchor (2020–2023)
- Robin Meade
- Larry Mendte
- Erin Moriarty
- Cabot Rea
- Marty Reid

== Technical information ==
=== Subchannels ===
The station's signal is multiplexed:

Subchannels of WCMH-TV
| Subchannel | Res. | Short name | Programming |
|---|---|---|---|
| 4.1 | 1080i | WCMH-HD | NBC |
| 4.2 | 480i | GRIT-TV | Grit |
| 4.3 | 720p | ION TV | Ion |
| 4.4 | 480i | Laff TV | Laff |
| 53.3 | 480i | Comet | Comet (WWHO) |

Broadcast on behalf of another station

WCMH replaced RTV with MeTV on September 26, 2011, as part of a groupwide affiliation agreement with Media General; the channel replaced RTV on some Media General-owned stations in other markets. MeTV was replaced by Court TV on September 26, 2019. Court TV was replaced with Grit on April 1, 2023.

=== Analog-to-digital conversion ===
WCMH-TV shut down its analog signal, over VHF channel 4, on June 12, 2009, as part of the federally mandated transition from analog to digital television. The station's digital signal remained on its pre-transition UHF channel 14, using virtual channel 4.

=== NextGen TV upgrade ===
As part of a deal between Nexstar and Sinclair Broadcast Group (owner of WSYX and operator of WTTE and WWHO), on January 7, 2021, WCMH-TV started hosting the ATSC 1.0 channel for WWHO 53.3 as part of Columbus's adoption of ATSC 3.0 using the HVEC video compression standard. Simultaneous with the move, WCMH-TV's main signal is now broadcasting in ATSC 3.0 on WWHO alongside WWHO's main signal, WSYX 6.3 (the former intellectual property of WTTE), and WTTE 28.2. The move left WBNS-TV as the only major network station in Columbus not broadcasting in ATSC 3.0 in some capacity.

== Video links ==
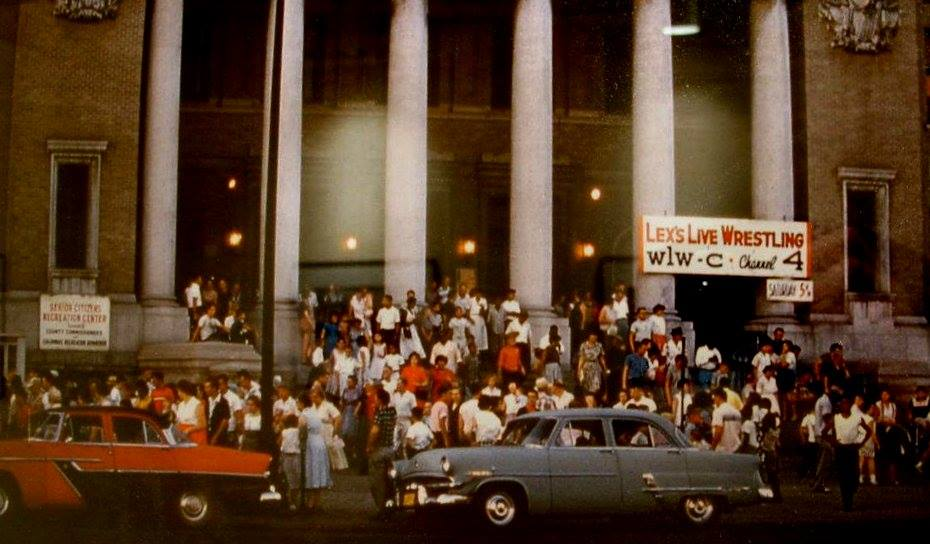
Crowds gathering in the 1950s to watch Lex's Live Wrestling broadcast from Memorial Hall in Columbus, Ohio on WLW-C (now WCMH).

- 1955 WLW Weathercast – Weather and news reports originated from WLW-T and were relayed to each station by microwave link for broadcast to Columbus, Cincinnati and Dayton audiences. The Three City Final newscast aired on WLW-C until December 1957; WLW-T weather forecasts continued to air until 1965 or 1966.
- Jack Hanna Visits Bob Braun – Bob Braun and his predecessor Ruth Lyons hosted a talk show live weekdays at noon on the WLW stations in Columbus, Cincinnati, Indianapolis and Dayton.
- Paul Dixon Show – Another staple of WLW regional programming was the Paul Dixon Show originating in Cincinnati and airing mornings on all WLW stations. Comedian and talk show host David Letterman credits Paul Dixon as being the inspiration for his show.
- 1956 WLWC Sign-Off (Audio Only) – Original WLWC audio from 1956.
- 1980s WCMH-TV Sign-Off
- Spook Beckman's Coffee Club (mid-1960s)
- Dance Party Video The Edicates performing live on WLWC's Dance Party, hosted by Jerry Rasor (November 11, 1969)
- Kate Smith Tribute to WLW-C – Kate Smith's Third Birthday Tribute to WLW-C (April 3, 1952)
