= WHJM =

Radio Maria station in Anna, Ohio

Coordinates: 40.467°N 84.190°W

- Anna, Ohio; United States
- Broadcast area: Northern portion of Miami Valley and greater Lima area
- Frequency: 88.7 (MHz)
- Branding: "Radio Maria"

Programming
- Format: Christian radio(Catholic)

Ownership
- Owner: Radio Maria Inc.
- Sister stations: WULM, KNIR, KDEI, KOJO, KBIO; WHHN, WRMW, WOLM

History
- First air date: June 15, 2006
- Call sign meaning: With the Hearts of Jesus and Mary

Technical information
- Licensing authority: FCC
- Class: A (non commercial)
- ERP: 1,000 watts
- HAAT: 97 meters (318 feet)

Links
- Public license information: Public file; LMS
- Webcast: Listen Live
- Website: www.radiomaria.us

WHJM, "Radio Maria" (for "Hearts of Jesus and Mary") is a non-commercial FM station operating at 88.7 MHz licensed to Anna, Ohio. It is a repeater station of KJMJ (AM) 580 in Alexandria, Louisiana (where its local Catholic diocese is also headquartered) and is owned by Radio Maria Inc. airing inspirational music and Catholic programming for the Upper Miami Valley region of Shelby, Auglaize, Allen, Logan, Mercer, Miami and surrounding counties in West Central Ohio. It is part of the international broadcast ministry of The World Family of Radio Maria, which is based in Italy and broadcasts in over thirty countries in thirteen languages worldwide. The station also audiostreams from its website for listeners outside its immediate signal area in addition to its very own smartphone app, the Tune In app and the Alexa device.

== History ==
A group of New York City-based volunteers known as "Friends of Radio Maria" which operates an Italian language FM subcarrier (of WKTU) acquired the original funding and construction permit for the new station in 2001 by means of a New York-based fundraiser called a "Mariathon." The construction permit however initially sat dormant until it was discovered by a group of Dayton area volunteers in 2005 looking for a Miami Valley frequency to start a local Catholic station. After a tower site was found, WHJM joined the Radio Maria family on June 8, 2006, while volunteers feverishly proceeded with preparations to get on the air before the construction permit was to have expired.

Within just a few days prior to the construction permit's deadline date to start broadcasting, WHJM "Radio Maria" first came on the air on June 15, 2006. Its transmitting antenna and tower was abruptly struck by a spectacular display of lightning only after two hours on the air during its inaugural sign-on. However, the brief airtime before the lightning strike was enough to fulfill the FCC deadline. After necessary repairs were made, WHJM returned to the air August 11, 2006. Its current operating power is 1,000 watts ERP. WHJM's current signal fades-out north of Lima at Beaverdam where WJTA's FM translator (W204CU) in Findlay fades in, followed by CIMX in Windsor, Ontario which begins to fade-in north towards Bowling Green and Toledo. Its signal also fades out to the south near Tipp City where listeners can switch to 1600 AM (WULM) in Springfield or 103.3 FM (WULM's translator W277AO) in Enon.

Friends of Radio Maria also helped acquire the construction permits of new repeater stations WOLM in D'Iberville, Mississippi near Biloxi and WRMW licensed to Peshtigo serving the Door Peninsula region of northeastern Wisconsin. These stations are now licensed to Radio Maria Inc.

== Call sign history ==
The WHJM call letters were previously used at an Urban/R&B/Hip-Hop formatted station at 107.7 FM in Ledyard/Pawcatuk, Connecticut. The call sign for that station has since switched to WWRX. Before that, the WHJM calls were used on 1180 AM in Knoxville, Tennessee which had used Christian Country, Adult Standards and talk radio formats. That station is now WKCE.

KJMJ has been on the air as the US flagship station of Radio Maria since May 2000. Originally, the 580 frequency was home to KALB-AM, sister station to KALB-TV channel 5.

Radio Maria was founded at first with humble beginnings as a small parish-operated station in Erba (province of Como,) Italy in 1983 before its subsequent international growth in the 1990s which gave birth to the World Family in 1998. Emanuele Ferrario is Radio Maria's founder and Carlo DiMaggio as its president.

== Facilities and programming ==
Though WHJM, for the most part, is a repeater of KJMJ, there is a studio facility west of Anna in nearby Minster which originates several live programs including "Living The Lectionary" (now hosted by Julia Monnin after the passing of Father Rick Nieberding in 2019) and Herb Wilker's Hospice program "Letting Go." Past local programs originated by audio recording and over telephone lines included "At Home With Jesus' with Glenda Canfield,"From The Tummy To The Heart" and "Francesca and Friends" presented by Francesca Franchina from The University of Dayton's Marian Library. The studio officially opened on Sunday April 22, 2007 with a prayer and blessing service and open house officiated by Father Rick Nieberding C.P.P.S.(1953–2019) who was pastor of St. Augustine Church and the original presenter of the program "Living The Lectionary." WHJM was also the originator of the yearly remote broadcast of the Fatima USA candlelight prayer vigil which takes place in the evening during the month of August at Maria Stein, a concelebration involving parishes from Minster, Marion Township and Saint Henry.

Overnight programming was provided by Radio Maria New York and originated by WSNR 620 am licensed in Jersey City, New Jersey. Radio Maria now airs evening and overnight repeats of various daytime programs aired for listeners who work dayshift hours.

Prior to the studio opening, a public information session took place on August 29, 2006, at St. Charles Center in Carthagena, Ohio to introduce Radio Maria to local listeners and the northern portion of the Cincinnati archdiocese.

The WHJM transmitter is located to the north in nearby Botkins...at the Microwave radio relay tower site (formerly used by AT&T Long Lines) on West State Street (with the Hogg horn antennas removed prior to WHJM's 2006 sign-on.)

The WHJM studio is located in the Hoying Profesional Building at the corner of Main and Fourth Streets..the intersection of Ohio State Routes 119 and 66 in downtown Minster.

== Radio Maria's AM station for Dayton/Springfield area ==
According to a Springfield News-Sun story dated March 10, 2008, Radio Maria USA purchased WULM (the former WBLY) from Urban Light Ministries in Springfield, Ohio. The application for license transfer and purchase which took place on February 15, 2008, was granted FCC approval on April 16, 2008. The AM station acquisition now brings Radio Maria programming to Springfield, Dayton, Tipp City, Troy, Urbana and other communities in the Miami Valley not reached by WHJM's signal. WULM's signal also has the potential to reach east towards Columbus and west towards Richmond, Indiana along U.S. 40 and I-70. WULM is also simulcast for the north Dayton suburbs on FM translator W277AO at 103.3 FM in Enon.

Radio Maria programming on WULM commenced on Saturday, May 31, 2008, at 12 noon local time. The WULM studio (formerly located at WIZE's transmitter site and now-vacated studio on Miracle Mile Road) is now located at the Father Boyle Center (the former parish convent) on Lagonda Avenue next to St. Bernard Parish east of downtown Springfield.

Radio Maria now offers its audiostreaming though the iPhone, BlackBerry and Android mobile phone devices in addition to its own World Family Smartphone app and the TuneIn app for listeners outside of WHJM and WULM's signal area in addition to the Amazon Alexa device which can be accessed by the vocal command: "Alexa...Open Radio Maria." hence Radio Maria USA now has nationwide coverage outside the signal areas of its terrestrial stations.

Mary Pyper, (presenter of "Marian Apparitions" and past National President) is currently the National Board Treasurer of Radio Maria USA. Jim Linthicum is local voiceover/audio production technician. Cletus Prenger is Minster studio technician. Ernestine Miller (1923–2013) (formerly with WERM, now WFGF) served as Minster studio and office public relations representative, Greg Oen associate recording and remote broadcast technician, Nick Hoying associate remote broadcast technician and Jim Boeckman (1941–2019) was volunteer in charge of promotion and publicity before his passing. Rose Luthman is current Minster studio and office manager.

== See also ==
- KJMJ
- KBIO
- WULM
- WHHN
- WMKL
- HMWN(now Radio Maria Canada, a webcaster)
