= WHHN =

Coordinates: 40.489°N 78.355°W

- Hollidaysburg, Pennsylvania; United States
- Broadcast area: Hollidaysburg and Altoona, Pennsylvania
- Frequency: 88.1 MHz
- Branding: "Radio Maria"

Programming
- Format: Christian radio

Ownership
- Owner: Radio Maria Inc.
- Sister stations: KNIR, KDEI, KOJO, KBIO, WHJM, WULM.WOLM, WRMW

History
- First air date: June 13, 2009
- Call sign meaning: "His Holy Name"

Technical information
- Licensing authority: FCC
- Class: B1 (non-commercial)
- ERP: 850 watts (horizontal); 670 watts (vertical)
- HAAT: 1,352 feet (412 meters)

Links
- Public license information: Public file; LMS
- Webcast: Listen Live
- Website: radiomaria.us

WHHN (88.1 FM, "Radio Maria" (for "His Holy Name") is a non-commercial radio station licensed to serve the community of Hollidaysburg, Pennsylvania. It is part of national Catholic network Radio Maria USA based at KJMJ in Alexandria, Louisiana.

== Brief history ==
WHHN is the second Catholic station in the Altoona market, the other being local low-power WMES which are not affiliated with each other nor co-owned. WHHN is owned and operated by Radio Maria Inc. and is a repeater of originating station KJMJ 580 kHz in Alexandria, Louisiana. WHHN's initial sign-on took place on Saturday morning, June 13, 2009. WHHN is the seventh of what is a network of repeaters originated by KJMJ which has been on the air since May 2000...the former KLBG and originally KALB (AM). In 2007, Radio Maria USA applied for ten additional frequencies on the FM band; up to that point it was only a six-station network comprising KJMJ (AM) with three repeaters (one AM and two FMs in Louisiana) with one AM in Texas and an FM and AM in Ohio. Audio streaming plays a huge part in its network operations as its repeater network slowly begins to grow. KJMJ with its repeaters and audiostream make up Radio Maria's only English language network. Radio Maria's international base is located in Erba (CO), within the Province of Como, Italy, and is managed by its founder Emanuele Ferrario. In addition to its English language network, Radio Maria USA operates a Spanish-language network in Houston, New York City and Chicago using FM subcarriers along with an Italian language FM subcarrier also located in New York. Audio streaming of their programming is offered as well from their respective websites.

== Facilities and Programming ==
Though WHHN has yet no local studio, its transmitter is located north of Hollidaysburg on the eastern outskirts of Altoona. However, a live program is originated in the Philadelphia area, "Don't Give Up" presented by Anne McGlone and Anna Iatesta live from Cabry Hall located on the campus of The Malvern Retreat House at St Joseph's-In-The-Hills on Wednesday afternoons at 5pm local time. More locally originated programming is planned and is in the works new FM station. In addition to the Altoona area, the WHHN signal can be received on a regular car radio along portions of the Pennsylvania Turnpike in the areas of Bedford west of the Sideling Hill travel service plaza and east of the Allegheny Mountain Tunnel.

Listeners outside WHHN's signal area can also access the station's audiostream anywhere in Pennsylvania by using the Alexa, iPhone, BlackBerry and Android mobile phone devices by means of downloading an app from the Radio Maria website.

Mary Pyper is national board president. Joshua Danis is national co-ordinator. Frank Hare is studio/production manager.

Father Duane Stenzel O.F.M. (1927–2011) served as national program director from May 2000 until his death.

== See also ==
- KJMJ
- KBIO
- WULM
- WHJM
- HMWN
