= WRMW =

Coordinates: 44.906°N 87.371°W

- Peshtigo, Wisconsin (transmitter located at WDOR-FM tower north of Sturgeon Bay, Wisconsin); United States
- Broadcast area: Peshtigo, Sturgeon Bay, Door Peninsula and northeastern portions of Green Bay areas
- Frequency: 91.3 MHz
- Branding: "Radio Maria"

Programming
- Format: Christian radio

Ownership
- Owner: Radio Maria Inc.
- Sister stations: KNIR, KBIO, KDEI, KOJO; WHJM, WHHN, WULM, WOLM

History
- First air date: May 26, 2010
- Call sign meaning: Wonderful Radio Maria Wisconsin

Technical information
- Licensing authority: FCC
- Class: C3
- ERP: 5,400 watts
- HAAT: 170 meters (558 feet)

Links
- Public license information: Public file; LMS
- Webcast: Listen Live
- Website: radiomaria.us

WRMW (91.3 FM "Radio Maria" (for: Radio Maria-Wisconsin)) is a non-commercial radio station licensed to Peshtigo, Wisconsin serving the Sturgeon Bay area with Catholic programming. WRMW's signal and tower height also has the potential to reach into portions of the southern tip of the Upper Peninsula of Michigan and the western coast of the Lower Peninsula of Michigan.

WRMW began as a construction permit licensed in May 2007 to its founder "Friends of Radio Maria." (Friends of Radio Maria also airs Italian language Catholic programming on the FM subcarrier of New York station WKTU and on the internet.) WRMW is now owned and operated (and licensed to) Radio Maria Inc.

Upon its initial sign-on which took place on May 26, 2010 just days before the construction permit expiration date, WRMW initially aired separate pre-recorded programming from the network archives while it was awaiting the installation of its satellite receiver and dish antenna from originating station KJMJ 580 kHz in Alexandria, Louisiana. Sample archived programming of Radio Maria USA's repeater network geared to the local Catholic community aired from May 26–30 to fulfill the FCC deadline. After a brief period of being off the air, the satellite feed became available on the evening of June 18, 2010, thus allowing WRMW to return to the air to join the KJMJ-originated repeater network and the Radio Maria family on a live full-time basis. This took place the following day on Saturday June 19, 2010.

Audiostreaming from its website is also available for listeners outside its immediate signal area in addition to iPhone, BlackBerry and Android mobile phone devices by means of downloading the appropriate app from the same website.

Another repeater which also took to the air within the same timeframe is WOLM 88.1 mHz in D'Iberville, Mississippi serving the Biloxi area which made its on-air debut on May 27, 2010.

Peshtigo (WRMW's city of license) is a reference to the Peshtigo fire and Marian visionary Adele Brice who in 1859 was visited by the Blessed Virgin Mary on several occasions prior to the killer firestorm of October 8, 1871 in which countless refugees fled to the Shrine of Our Lady of Good Help located near the community of Champion just northeast of Green Bay. The fire miraculously missed the Shrine, saving the uncounted lives of the people and livestock. It was the first Marian apparition that was approved by the Catholic Church which took place in the United States.

== See also ==
- Radio Maria
- KJMJ (originating U.S. station)
- Peshtigo fire
