= WOLM =

Coordinates: 30.444°N 88.848°W

- D'Iberville, Mississippi (Transmitter located in St. Martin, Mississippi); United States
- Broadcast area: D'Iberville, Biloxi, Gulfport, Ocean Springs
- Frequency: 88.1 mHz
- Branding: "Radio Maria"

Programming
- Format: Christian radio

Ownership
- Owner: Radio Maria Inc.
- Sister stations: KNIR, KDEI, KOJO, KBIO, WHJM, WHHN, WULM, WRMW

History
- First air date: May 27, 2010
- Call sign meaning: With Our Loving Mother

Technical information
- Licensing authority: FCC
- Class: A
- ERP: 1,000 watts
- HAAT: 66 meters (217 feet)

Links
- Public license information: Public file; LMS
- Webcast: Listen Live
- Website: radiomaria.us

WOLM "Radio Maria" (for: Our Loving Mother) is a non-commercial FM broadcasting station at 88.1 mHz licensed to D'Iberville, Mississippi and serving the D'Iberville and Biloxi areas. Its founder "Friends of Radio Maria" (which in addition airs Italian language programming on the FM subcarrier of New York City station WKTU) was the group that acquired the construction permit and start-up of WOLM in addition to sister stations WHJM which is licensed in Anna, Ohio and WRMW 91.1 FM licensed in Peshtigo, Wisconsin. All these stations are now owned by (and licensed to) Radio Maria Inc.

WOLM began as a construction permit issued by the FCC in May 2007. It launched on the air May 27, 2010 just three days before the construction permit deadline date. It is now licensed. 88.1 FM is also the frequency of Radio Maria-owned WHHN in Hollidaysburg, Pennsylvania serving the Altoona area.

Upon its initial sign-on, WOLM initially was airing sample archived programming from Radio Maria until the network connection with originator KJMJ was established. This took place on Tuesday June 1, 2010 making WOLM a full-time repeater of originating station KJMJ 580 kHz in Alexandria, Louisiana. Also launched within the same time frame is WRMW 91.3 mHz in Peshtigo, Wisconsin serving the Sturgeon Bay - Door County region.

Radio Maria USA also streams from its website for listeners outside the WOLM signal area in addition to iPhone, BlackBerry and Android mobile phone devices through an app which can be downloaded from the same website.

A hip-hop collective based out of Washington DC, New York, New Jersey, and Germany. WOLM (World Of Light Media). Formed in 2008 by Shamir and Nyce.

== See also ==
- Radio Maria
- KJMJ
