= KDEI =

Radio station in Port Arthur, Texas

- Port Arthur, Texas; United States
- Broadcast area: Port Arthur, Beaumont
- Frequency: 1250 kHz
- Branding: "Radio Maria"

Programming
- Language: English
- Format: Christian radio

Ownership
- Owner: Radio Maria Inc.
- Sister stations: KJMJ, KOJO, WOLM, KNIR, WHJM, WHHN, WULM, WRMW

History
- First air date: 1925 (in Brownsville, moved to Port Arthur in 1934)
- Former call signs: KWWG (1925–1934); KPAC (1934–1981); KTXC (1981–1984); KALO (1984–2000)

Technical information
- Licensing authority: FCC
- Facility ID: 20490
- Class: B
- Power: 5,000 watts (day non-directional); 1,000 watts (night directional)
- Transmitter coordinates: 29°57′4″N 93°52′46″W

Links
- Public license information: Public file; LMS
- Webcast: Listen Live
- Website: radiomaria.us

KDEI (1250 AM "Radio Maria") is a radio station airing Catholic programming in Port Arthur, Texas. It is a repeater station of KJMJ 580 kHz in Alexandria, Louisiana.

== History ==
=== In Brownsville ===
KDEI's history begins not in Port Arthur but in Brownsville, on the Mexican border, where KWWG was authorized on 1080 kHz in 1925. The next year, it moved to 1260 kHz in a time-share with KRGV, which broadcast from Weslaco. The station was owned by the Chamber of Commerce and the City of Brownsville and by the Brownsville Herald newspaper after 1930.

Violent storms hit south Texas in August 1933, leaving KWWG out of commission. When the station applied for renewal of its license, it also sought to be sold to Port Arthur College, which planned to move the station to Port Arthur. The Federal Radio Commission approved the move, which also allowed KRGV to go full time in Weslaco. Two petitioners, involved in the operation of KFDM radio in Beaumont, sought to deny the move of KWWG to Port Arthur, but were refused, and KWWG left the Valley for Port Arthur with a new callsign, KPAC.

=== In Port Arthur ===
In 1938, KPAC moved from 1260 to 1220 kHz, only to be relocated to 1250 in 1941 as a result of the NARBA reallocation.

KPAC had a middle of the road radio format, switching to Top 40 music in the late 1950s. It is believed locally that blues/rock artist (and Port Arthur native) Janis Joplin frequently visited KPAC's studio during her recording career. During this period, KPAC founded a sister FM at 98.5 MHz, at first as a simulcast of KPAC in 1963, which is now Spanish-language KTJM. KPAC switched back to the previous MOR format in 1966.

In 1974, Port Arthur College was absorbed by Lamar University. In 1977, KPAC-AM-FM were sold to Clear Channel Communications, which changed the callsign to KTXC in 1981 and KALO (K-Low) in 1984.

K-Low carried an R&B format which competed with Beaumont's former 1380 KJET ("K-Jet") with a similar soul music format. KTXC/KALO's studios were located at the transmitter site at 7700 Gulfway Drive in Port Arthur from the Clear Channel sale until its sale to Radio Maria Inc. in 2000. KDEI (in November 2000) along with originator KJMJ (in May 2000) and sisters KOJO and KNIR (in September 2000) were the first stations forming Radio Maria's USA network and the first to broadcast in English. KDEI can also be heard during daytime hours (at 5,000 watts) in portions of the Houston and Pasadena areas and just outside the Lake Charles, Louisiana area where KOJO at 91.1 FM can be heard outside of KDEI's signal. In September 2005, Hurricane Rita destroyed KDEI's 500-foot tower and briefly knocked the station off the air. It returned to the air under special temporary authority for over a year at 250 watts on its shorter daytime tower while an emergency fundraiser and on-air pleas were made by program director Father Duane Stenzel O.F.M. The fundraiser succeeded meeting and beating its goal, a new tower was erected and KDEI was officially back on the air at full power by the end of 2007; though the STA to the FCC stated that the station expected to be back to normal within 90 days, the 6-month request turned into a 2-year STA with extensions. Online streaming is available for listeners outside of KDEI's daytime signal and when it must power down at sunset to 1,000 watts. In addition to broadcasting full-time in English, Radio Maria USA also airs a Spanish-language program "Pueblo de Dios" (People of God), which is aired on Saturday mornings from 10:30 am until noon local time and again at 10 pm.

Radio Maria also offers full-time Spanish-language programming on the FM subcarrier of KPFT in Houston and online. (see links below)

Listeners outside KDEI's signal can listen online in addition to Alexa, iPhone, BlackBerry and Android mobile phone devices by downloading the appropriate app from the Radio Maria website.

The KPAC callsign is now used at an FM station in San Antonio, Texas.

The KALO callsign is now used at an independent religious television station in Honolulu, Hawaii.

== See also ==
- Radio Maria
- KJMJ
- KNIR
- KOJO (FM)
