= WDOR =

WDOR may refer to:

- WDOR (AM), a radio station (910 AM) licensed to Sturgeon Bay, Wisconsin, United States
- WDOR-FM, a radio station (93.9 FM) licensed to Sturgeon Bay, Wisconsin, United States
