= KOJO (FM) =

Coordinates: 30.2021°N 92.9465°W

- Lake Charles, Louisiana; United States
- Broadcast area: Lake Charles and Southwestern Louisiana
- Frequency: 91.1 MHz

Programming
- Format: Christian radio

Ownership
- Owner: Radio Maria Inc.
- Sister stations: KJMJ, KDEI, KNIR, WULM; WOLM, WHHN, KBIO, WRMW

History
- First air date: September 17, 2000

Technical information
- Licensing authority: FCC
- Facility ID: 39891
- Class: C3
- ERP: 4,000 watts horizontal 14,000 watts vertical
- HAAT: 118 meters (387 ft)

Links
- Public license information: Public file; LMS
- Webcast: Listen Live
- Website: radiomaria.us

KOJO "Radio Maria" is a non-commercial FM broadcasting station at 91.1 MHz in Lake Charles, Louisiana. Radio Maria USA airs Catholic programming.

== History ==
KOJO is the first FM repeater of originating station KJMJ 580 AM in Alexandria, Louisiana. KOJO first came on the air on September 17, 2000. KOJO's signal reaches into a fringe area in portions of southeastern Texas, where afterward is covered by KDEI 1250 AM in Port Arthur...as well into portions of the Lafayette area..where KNIR 1360 AM in New Iberia compensates for KOJO's fringe area there.

Father Duane Stenzel O.F.M. (1927–2011) served as national program director from its 2000 beginnings until his death.

Mary Pyper is national board president, Joshua Danis is national coordinator and Frank Hare is studio and audio production manager.

Listeners outside KOJO's signal area can also listen online (or by Alexa, iPhone, BlackBerry and Android mobile phone devices by means of downloading the appropriate app) from Radio Maria's website.

== See also ==
- KJMJ
- KBIO
- KNIR
- KDEI
