= WULM =

Radio station in Springfield, Ohio

- Springfield, Ohio; United States
- Broadcast area: Springfield, Dayton and Miami Valley area
- Frequency: 1600 kHz

Programming
- Format: Christian radio (Catholic)
- Network: Radio Maria

Ownership
- Owner: Radio Maria Inc.

History
- First air date: April 1947
- Former call signs: WJEL (1946–1954); WBLY (1954–2002)
- Call sign meaning: former owner Urban Light Ministries; also "Under Our Lady's Mantle"

Technical information
- Licensing authority: FCC
- Facility ID: 55232
- Class: D
- Power: 1,000 watts (day); 34 watts (night)
- Transmitter coordinates: 39°57′11.2″N 83°52′6.8″W
- Translator: 103.3 W277AO (Enon)

Links
- Public license information: Public file; LMS
- Webcast: Listen live
- Website: radiomaria.us

WULM (1600 AM) is a non-commercial radio station licensed to Springfield, Ohio, United States, and features a Catholic-oriented Christian format as a full-time owned-and-operated outlet of the "Radio Maria" network.

== History ==
WULM's history dates back to 1946 when it was founded as commercial daytime station WJEL. At the time of its founding, the station was licensed in nearby Dayton, Ohio. Country music singer Donnie Bowser (Bowshier), a Springfield resident performed frequently on WJEL's live Saturday night program. In 1954, the station was moved to Springfield and was given a new call sign: WBLY, which previously had been used by the present-day WIMA in Lima, Ohio. The BLY in WBLY stood for (Bill) Bailey, (Stan) Lucas and (Bob) Yontz, the three principal owners.

The station's move was nearly coincidental with the move of Springfield station WWSO to Dayton, where it became WAVI (now known as the AM incarnation of WDAO formerly on 107.7 FM). WBLY's studios were first located in the Chamber of Commerce building at the corner of Spring and High streets in the early 1950s then moving to a more modern facility at 1711 West Main Street along with sister WBLY-FM which would later become WAZU.

The station used the call letters WBLY from 1954 to 2002. It was owned and operated by Champion City Broadcasting which in the mid-1980s moved its studios to the restored (original) city building located downtown along with WAZU prior to being sold off in the 1990s. Bob Yontz sold the remaining AM station to son Ronald- hence Champion City Broadcasting became RAY (Ronald A. Yontz) Broadcasting operated by Jerry Staggs as part of a local marketing agreement with WIZE which he briefly owned and moving the WBLY studios to the WIZE site until 2002 when it was sold to Urban Light Ministries, a local non-denominational Christian charity in April 2002 which adopted the WULM call letters in August of that same year. Urban Light's purchase of the station kept it a locally owned and operated community citizen and was intended to help provide operating funds and a medium for the local ministry to reach out to pre-believers and to families in need. WULM remained the last locally owned/operated commercial radio station licensed by the FCC to Springfield still operating with studios and offices in Springfield until May 31, 2008.

John Hall (John Stalder), a longtime Springfield radio broadcast legend, was the first station manager of WULM from 2002 to 2003. After Hall's death in 2004, the on-air studio originally used by WIZE was renovated in 2005 and dedicated in his memory by his longtime friend Bob Pitsch who was station manager from 2003 to 2006. Hall was best known as the longtime morning personality at WIZE and later a personality at WKSW, WLW, WGRR, WBNS and the former WCLR/WZLR "Oldies 95" in addition to doing voice-over work for the former WTJC-TV (now WBDT) and for numerous radio commercials and announcements in the Dayton-Springfield area.

== WBLY-FM ==
Now WDHT (Hot 102.9), WBLY-FM was founded in 1958 and broadcast on 102.9 MHz. It was a simulcast of WBLY from 1958 to 1979 and played the same middle of the road format as WBLY. It was also owned by Champion City Broadcasting. In 1979 they changed the call letters to WAZU ("FM-103 The Zoo...From A to Z to You") and stopped simulcasting WBLY and began playing adult contemporary music aimed at the Dayton audience. At that time it was licensed to Springfield and had the same studios as WBLY. In the late 1980s, one of the principal owners died. The heirs had the station appraised and found it to be worth millions of dollars. The station went on the market and was sold to Osborne Communications. From 1988 to 1995 the station competed fiercely with WTUE-FM but in 1995 it was sold to Great Trails Broadcasting and its callsign was changed to WING and it played classic rock from 1995 to 2001. It was known as WING-FM and had the same format until 2001 when it was sold to Radio One and changed to its current call sign WDHT and its urban format, "Blazin Hip Hop and R&B". Mainline Broadcasting took over the station in 2007. The callsign WING is still in use (and were in use before WING-FM) by "ESPN Radio 1410".

== Past programming ==
WULM has had many different formats over the years since it started broadcasting. Originally country (as WJEL) when it was founded, when it was sold to a group of local businessmen and the call letters were changed to WBLY for the principals - Bailey, Lucas and Yontz. The station operated at 1600 kHz with 1,000 watts of power from sunrise to sunset. During winter months, WBLY was authorized to operate at 250 watts from 6:00 AM until sunrise. The format was changed to talk in the morning along with music, with its host Smilin' Bob (Bob Yontz) and was a MOR station (Middle of the Road) the rest of the day. Smilin Bob remained a personality on the station through the 1970s and into the early 1990s. He became greatly known all around the valley. He was famous for giving all of his callers a nickname, and he handed out many. WBLY also aired a Sunday morning big band program hosted by Roger Sharp that was the top rated program in its time slot for the Dayton area. Upon Sharp's death in 1989, the Sunday morning program was hosted by Tom Eipper (airname Tom James). In 1981 WBLY changed its format to classic country and switching to oldies in 1987 and the following year it was "sold" to Yontz's son Ron, who operated RAY broadcasting. In 1988 WBLY moved its tower from its former AM-friendly location off West First Street to a more FM-friendly location on Miller Road. The tower move increased WAZU's coverage in the Dayton area, but was detrimental to the AM station. Also in 1988 WBLY (which was a "daytime" station) received authorization to operate 24 hours per day. The authorized power from sunset to sunrise was 30 watts. To celebrate, and in keeping with the format, staff members Dale Grimm and Jim Mosier were on the air for 24 continuous hours, operating from the station's "street studio" on the first floor of the Marketplace on South Fountain Avenue.

WBLY switched the format to a news/sports/talk format in the early 1990s. WBLY did mostly Catholic Central games until WIZE went under and then began airing all teams in Clark County. It was famous for not only having 1 game but in football and basketball it aired one game live and one game on tape delay. It also did Wittenberg football and basketball games along with a show during the week. It also had a high school sports talk show during the week and a popular show on Saturday morning called "Sports Scene". During the tournament it would air all local teams' games, and sometimes there would be so many teams playing that they would go until 2:00 am. They also had great news coverage, and the news director was Darryl Bauer, who is now at WHIO.

In 2002 WBLY was sold to Urban Light Ministries. After they changed the call letters to WULM they continued to have a news/sports/talk format but added more programming including a local morning talk show and a late-morning talk show that talked about the issues in Clark County. After that, sports director Marty Bannister continued his "Sports Mid-Day" show that he aired during the week and had done before when it was WBLY. Other local content continuing into the name change included Sports Scene, cohosted by Dave Williams and John Derr, discussed local sports Saturday mornings, followed later in the day by Springfield Music Scene, hosted by Tony Pullins, that spotlighted local musicians. They also added more network programming, including Bill O'Reilley.

Unable to attract new listeners (and advertisers) with a talk format, WULM went to a unique "Rock n' Soul Classics" oldies format. It spotlighted the vintage hits from the first generation of the Top 40 and R&B genres of the 1950s, 60s and early 70s. During this time, its weekend programs along with NASCAR coverage included The Motown Show, Dennis Mitchell's Breakfast With The Beatles, Oldies Coast To Coast, Little Walter's Time Machine, Glenn Sauter's Hits of Yesteryear and Cool Bobby B's Doo Wop Stop. That format ran from the summer of 2003 to the spring of 2006.

On-air personalities included Marco Simmons (who also did high school sports play by play), Dale Grimm (also Sales Manager), Joe Madigan (then a student intern from John Carroll University and its campus FM station WJCU) and Bob Roberts (Bob Pitsch, General Manager). Michelle Phillips (Michelle Smart) worked with a news background as Darryl Bauer's replacement and later as Bob's on-air sidekick, Brad Lovett was sales associate and live remote broadcast personality and Jim Linthicum did freelance voice-over work for the oldies format.

They then switched to "Springfield's Sunshine Station" with a format of "The Fun Hits of the 70s and More" featuring primarily Top 40 hits of the 70s and early 80s, anchored by "The Bubba and Bubbey Morning Show" (Rich Mellott and Brad Lovett.) On-air, traffic, sales and production staff included Linda Mellott, Natalia Mendez, and Bob Blindauer. During this time billings and long-term contracts increased, and many on-air promotions and giveaways were done. In October 2006, the morning show and other staffers went on tours of haunted houses all over Southwest and Central Ohio, and gave away tickets to listeners. Winners were able to attend shows featuring the Blue Man Group, Trans Siberian Orchestra, Kenny Loggins, at Nationwide Arena and the Nutter Center, as well as performances of "Beauty and the Beast", "Cats" and a Rat Pack tribute show at Victoria Theatre and the Schuster Center in Downtown Dayton. The fun continued as WULM's format was flipped to Christmas music of all genres in November and December 2006, with staffers and winners having the opportunity to visit the Christmas Story House in Cleveland and the Clifton Mill holiday lights.

1600 WULM (as "Springfield's Community Station" from 2007 to 2008) aired Christian-oriented News/Talk from the USA Radio Network. They carried nearly all of their entire talk programming schedule as well as their news and sports updates.

WULM also produced local sports coverage in the last two decades before being sold to Radio Maria. The station produced a weekly sports program on Saturday mornings, and broadcast area high school sporting games. Marty Bannister, the current sideline football sideline reporter and women's basketball play-by-play for Ohio State, served as sports director of the station from the 90's until about 2005. Scott Leo, the current play-by-play man of the Columbus Clippers, broadcast games with Bannister and others at the station.

WULM also had local programming. One such program was Urban Light Ministries president Rev. Eli Williams' mid-morning (10:00) talk program "Crossing Over" dealing with local people and issues from a Christian and local community perspective. Rev. Williams was also the host of "Urban Light Radio" a contemporary gospel music program which aired on WULM during Sunday morning programming as well on Saturdays on Cedarville University's WCDR and on its "CDR Radio" the chain was sold in 2011 to EMF Broadcasting. It is now WKCD.

Rev. Williams now hosts The Hot Gospel 20, a locally produced online soul gospel music program.

WULM also served the community with Speak Out a locally produced community forum/on air town meeting on Saturday mornings after The Saturday Morning Sports Show.

From 2002 until July 2009, WULM's (and predecessor WBLY's) studios and offices were located on Miracle Mile in Springfield, at the transmitter site and former studios of WIZE which simulcast the programming of WONE in Dayton until the spring of 2011 when WIZE switched to a satellite country music format being fed from iHeart Media's Dayton studios. WULM's transmitter is located on Miller Road off State Route 41 West which is also the transmitting site of WDHT, originally the site of the former WBLY and WAZU, which was the former WBLY-FM, when both stations were owned by Champion City Broadcasting.

== Switchover to Radio Maria ==
According to a Springfield News-Sun story dated March 10, 2008, the station was purchased by Radio Maria, an Italian-based Catholic radio network which owns and operates KJMJ, its originating USA English-language station in Alexandria, Louisiana. The sale and transfer of license of WULM was filed on February 15, 2008 and was later approved on April 16, 2008 by the FCC. The switchover to Radio Maria programming took place at 12 noon Eastern Standard Time on Saturday May 31, 2008. The WULM signal not only reaches the Dayton, Springfield and Miami Valley area, but reaches east towards Columbus, south towards Wilmington and Middletown, north towards Urbana and Bellefontaine and west towards Richmond, Indiana during daylight hours.

An audiostream can also be accessed from its website (and from this article) for its listeners during evening hours (and outside its signal area) when WULM must power down just before local sunset to 34 watts in order to avoid interference with 25,000 watt KRVA a Spanish-language station in the Dallas/Fort Worth market and with urban progressive talker WWRL in New York City also with a 25,000 watt signal.

WULM is simulcast for the Dayton area neighborhoods on FM translator W277AO 103.3 mHz in Enon since the fall of 2015. Previously, this translator rebroadcast WKCD (the former WCDR) airing K-LOVE programming until October 2015 when it switched to Radio Maria programming. Radio Maria programming on WULM is also available through its own World Family mobile app in addition to a similar stream for Fire tablets and smartphones via the Tune In app and the Alexa device.

Originating station KJMJ has been on the air as the US flagship station of Radio Maria since May 2000. Originally, the 580 frequency was home to KALB, sister station to KALB-TV channel 5.

Radio Maria was founded at first with humble beginnings as a small parish operated station in the community of Erba (in the province of Como,) Italy in 1983 before its subsequent international growth in the 1990s which gave birth to the World Family in 1998. Emanuele Ferrario (now deceased) was Radio Maria's founder and its first president. Its international home base is located in Rome with Carlo DiMaggio as its current president.

W277AO's simulcast of Radio Maria programming on WULM also reaches the northern Dayton suburbs of Riverside, Vandalia, Huber Heights, Fairborn, Tipp City, West Milton, Troy and the communities of Park Layne, New Carlisle and portions of Beavercreek in addition to downtown Dayton if one is travelling north of the downtown area on Intestate 75.

== Facilities and programming ==
The Miller Road transmitter site shared with WDHT-FM is still in use. Though WULM along with WHJM licensed in Anna (serving the Upper Miami Valley and greater Lima area) for the most part is a repeater of KJMJ, there are several locally originating programs including "Living With Mary" which airs on Friday afternoons, Francesca Franchina's "From The Tummy To The Heart" and "Francesca and Friends" from The University of Dayton's Marian Library. The Miracle Mile studios were only used for broadcasting the originating network feed from Alexandria's KJMJ from May 2008 until February 2009. Due to satellite reception problems incurred early-on when its receiving dish was re-aligned, a new dish was installed at the Miller Rd. transmitting site in February 2009. In July 2009, Radio Maria and St. Vincent DePaul Society volunteers from the Dayton area moved the WULM studio facilities from the Miracle Mile location to a new studio which is located on the second floor of the Rev. John P. Boyle Memorial Center (the former parish convent also known as The Father Boyle Center) at 920 Lagonda Avenue next to St. Bernard Parish and the adjacent school east of downtown Springfield. The relocated WULM Springfield studio feeds several locally originating programs to originator KJMJ and its repeater network including "Be Your Best" presented by John Wright and "Meet The Author" presented by Ken Huck.

In addition to the Springfield studio at the Father Boyle Center, a Dayton studio with administrative offices opened in the summer of 2011 in the Marianist Center at Mount Saint John at 2235 East Patterson Road near Beavercreek where additional live local programs air. One such program "Crossroads, A Journey To Conversion" is presented by Mark Newman in addition to "Marian Apparitions" presented by Mary Pyper, "Carmelite Conversations" with Mark Danis and "The Catholic Grab Bag" presented by Marianist Father John Fletcher who is the local resident priest director.

In 2013, the Dayton studio moved to the Bergamo Center building at 4400 Shakertown Rd. on the south end of the Mount St. John campus when the former Marianist Center reverted to the Marianist Mission.

The current mailing address for WULM remains as P.O. Box 3339 Dayton, Ohio 45401 where inquiries for station donations and needed local volunteers will be referred to.

WULM listeners can also access the Radio Maria audiostream through the iPhone, BlackBerry, and Android mobile phone devices during the night time hours outside of Clark County and outside its regular daytime signal area. Downloads for the respective mobile device apps are found in the links below and at the Radio Maria USA website.

Radio Maria USA also streams from its own World Family Smartphone app, the Tune In app and the Amazon Alexa device by utilizing the vocal command: "Alexa, Open Radio Maria." ...thus Radio Maria's programming can also be heard throughout the Dayton/Springfield area on the aforementioned apps outside WULM's signal area.

Aside from the WIZE transmitter still located at Miracle Mile, the studio facilities are now vacant.

The WBLY calls are currently used by a low-power FM station in Sycamore, Georgia.

The WJEL calls are currently used by a high school FM station in Indianapolis, Indiana

== Video ==
A brief description and history of The World Family of Radio Maria

A brief video for listeners who want to listen outside of WULM's signal area in Dayton, the Miami Valley and elsewhere

== See also ==
- HMWN(now Radio Maria Canada, a webcaster)
- KBIO
- KJMJ
- WHHN
- WHJM
- WOLM
- WRMW
- WMKL

== Sources ==
- Springfield News-Sun article of WULM's pending sale to Radio Maria. (March 7, 2008)
- Springfield News-Sun story of WULM's transfer of license to Radio Maria. (March 10, 2008)
