= Peshtigo Fire Cemetery =

Cemetery in Marinette County, Wisconsin

- U.S. National Register of Historic Places
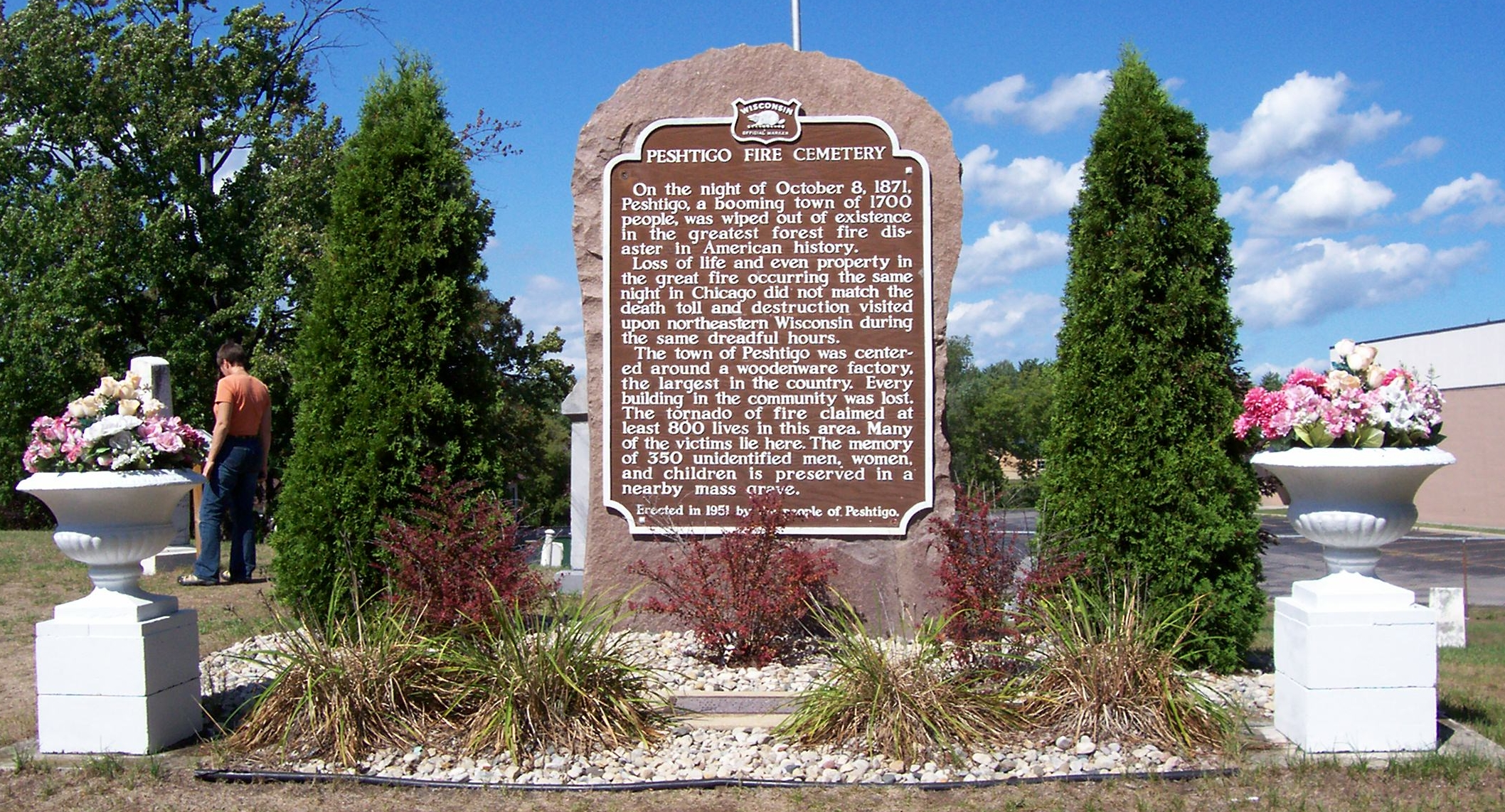
- Memorial marker
- Location: Peshtigo, Wisconsin
- Coordinates: 45°3′22.87″N 87°45′14.85″W
- Built: 1871
- NRHP reference No.: 70000037
- Added to NRHP: October 15, 1970

The Peshtigo Fire Cemetery is a cemetery in Peshtigo, Wisconsin. The cemetery is the burial location of the charred remains of victims of the Peshtigo Fire, of October 8, 1871, the deadliest natural fire in the history of the United States. Identified victims were buried in traditional marked graves, and over 300 unidentified victims were buried in a mass grave. The site is listed on the National Register of Historic Places. The memorial at the cemetery was the first official state historical marker authorized by the State Historic Society of Wisconsin. The cemetery is located adjacent to the Peshtigo Fire Museum, which is a memorial museum for the fire.

== Images ==
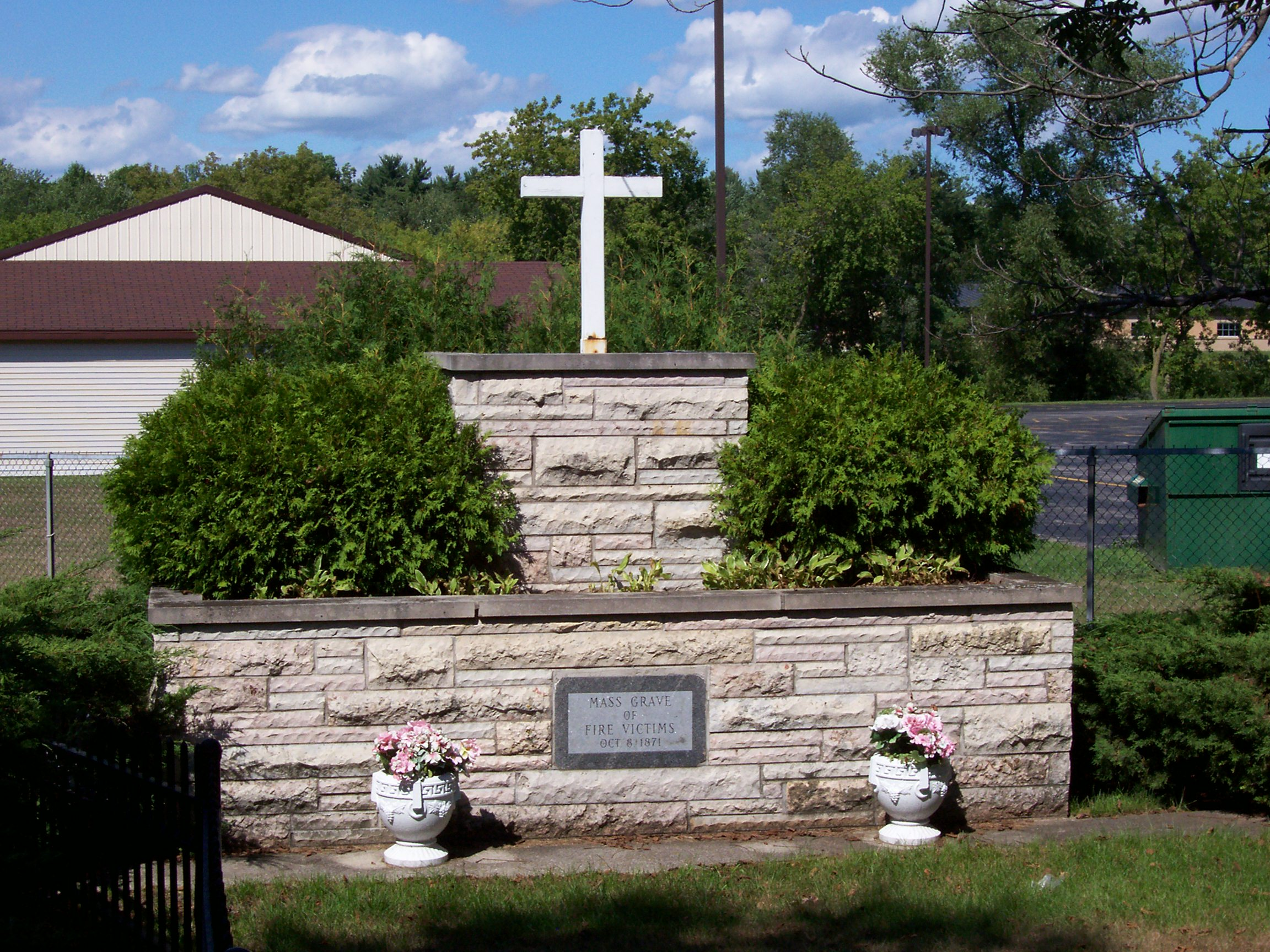
Marker for the mass grave

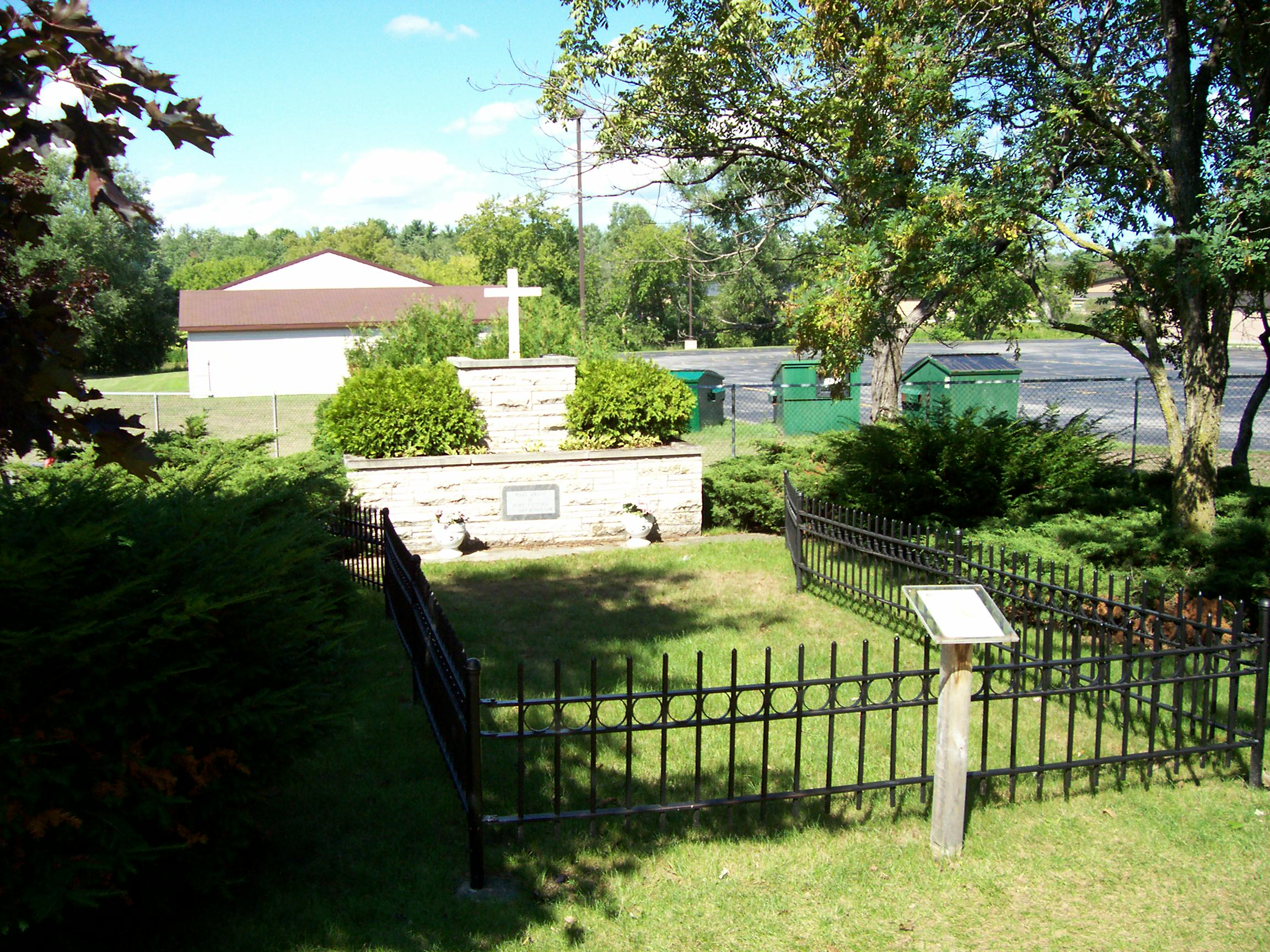
Mass grave
