= KJMJ =

Catholic radio station in Alexandria, Louisiana

- Alexandria, Louisiana; United States
- Broadcast area: Central Louisiana; Acadiana
- Frequency: 580 kHz
- Branding: Radio Maria

Programming
- Languages: English, Spanish and Italian
- Format: Christian radio (Catholic)
- Network: Radio Maria USA
- Affiliations: Radio Maria

Ownership
- Owner: Radio Maria, Inc.

History
- First air date: September 21, 1935; 90 years ago
- Former call signs: KALB (1935–1995); KLBG (1995–2000)
- Call sign meaning: Jesus, Mary, and Joseph

Technical information
- Licensing authority: FCC
- Facility ID: 20492
- Class: B
- Power: 5,000 watts day; 1,000 watts night
- Transmitter coordinates: 31°18′30″N 92°24′57″W
- Repeaters: See list of repeaters

Links
- Public license information: Public file; LMS
- Webcast: Listen live
- Website: radiomaria.us

KJMJ (580 AM) is a Catholic radio station broadcasting from Alexandria, Louisiana, United States. It is the originating station of Radio Maria USA, The World Family of Radio Maria's US operations, airing Catholic programming including a mix of traditional Catholic worship and contemporary Christian music, along with a weekday Mass, frequent recitals of the Holy Rosary and various talk and teaching programs on the Catholic faith.

It is simulcast on nine full powered stations and one low powered translator, and its audio stream can be accessed from its website and via apps for iPhone, BlackBerry, Windows and Android mobile phone devices. Radio Maria USA also streams on the TuneIn app.

== History ==
The station began broadcasting September 21, 1935, holding the call sign KALB. It was owned by the Alexandria Broadcasting Company, and originally broadcast at 1420 kHz, running 100 watts during daytime hours only. In 1937, the station's frequency was changed to 1210 kHz, and it began nighttime operations, running 250 watts during the day and 100 watts at night. In 1939, it began running 250 watts 24 hours a day. KALB's frequency was changed to 1240 kHz in March 1941, as a result of the North American Regional Broadcasting Agreement. In 1945, its frequency was changed to 580 kHz, and it ran 1,000 watts 24 hours a day. Its daytime power was increased to 5,000 watts in 1947.

In 1948, its FM sister KALB-FM 96.9 MHz (now KZMZ) began broadcasting, and simulcast the programming of KALB 580. It was later the radio sister of KALB-TV channel 5. It was an affiliate of ABC Radio in the 1940s, 1950s, and early 1960s. In 1962, it ended its affiliation with ABC and became a CBS affiliate. Over the years, KALB aired a variety of country music and contemporary hits programs. In the 1970s, the station aired a MOR format and in the 1980s it aired a country format. KALB aired an oldies format in the 1990s. In 1994, KALB was sold to Stellar Communications, along with 96.9 KZMZ, for $815,000.

In January 1995, the station was sold to Faith Broadcasting for $125,000. On January 17, 1995, its call sign was changed to KLBG, and it adopted a soul gospel format. The station was branded "Faith 580".

In late 1999, the station was sold Radio Maria Inc., along with AM 1250 KALO in Port Arthur, Texas, for $900,000. In January 2000, its call sign was changed to KJMJ and it was taken off the air while its facilities were being upgraded. Its initial broadcast as KJMJ commenced on May 25, 2000. It was the first English-language Radio Maria station in the United States. Afterward, a network of repeaters were established. Father Duane Stenzel O.F.M. served as its first national program director, Mass celebrant, teacher and on-air personality from its 2000 inception until his death on January 18, 2011.

== Repeaters ==
Radio Maria USA's programming can also be heard on these stations:

=== AM ===
Callsign	Frequency	Power	Location
KDEI	1250 kHz	5 kW (day); 1 kW (night)	Port Arthur, Texas
KNIR	1360 kHz	1 kW (day); 209 W (night)	New Iberia/Lafayette, Louisiana
WULM	1600 kHz	1 kW (day); 34 W (night)	Springfield/Dayton, Ohio

=== FM ===
Callsign	Frequency	Power	Location
WHHN	88.1 MHz	850 W (H); 670 W (V)	Hollidaysburg/Altoona, Pennsylvania
WOLM	88.1 MHz	1 kW	D'Iberville/Biloxi, Mississippi
WHJM	88.7 MHz	1 kW	Anna/Lima, Ohio
KBIO	89.7 MHz	1 kW	Natchitoches, Louisiana
KOJO	91.1 MHz	4 kW (H); 14 kW (V)	Lake Charles, Louisiana
WRMW	91.3 MHz	5.4 kW	Peshtigo/Green Bay, Wisconsin
WMKL	91.9 MHz	50 kW	Hammocks/Miami, Florida
W277AO	103.3 MHz	500 W	Enon/Dayton, Ohio

=== Former repeater ===
Callsign	Frequency	Location	Notes
KSIH	90.1 MHz	Belcourt, North Dakota	Licensed by the Federal Communications Commission in April 2013, but subsequently surrendered its license for cancellation in July 2018.
