= Peshtigo Fire Museum =

Firefighting museum and memorial

Coordinates: 45.055867°N 87.753372°W

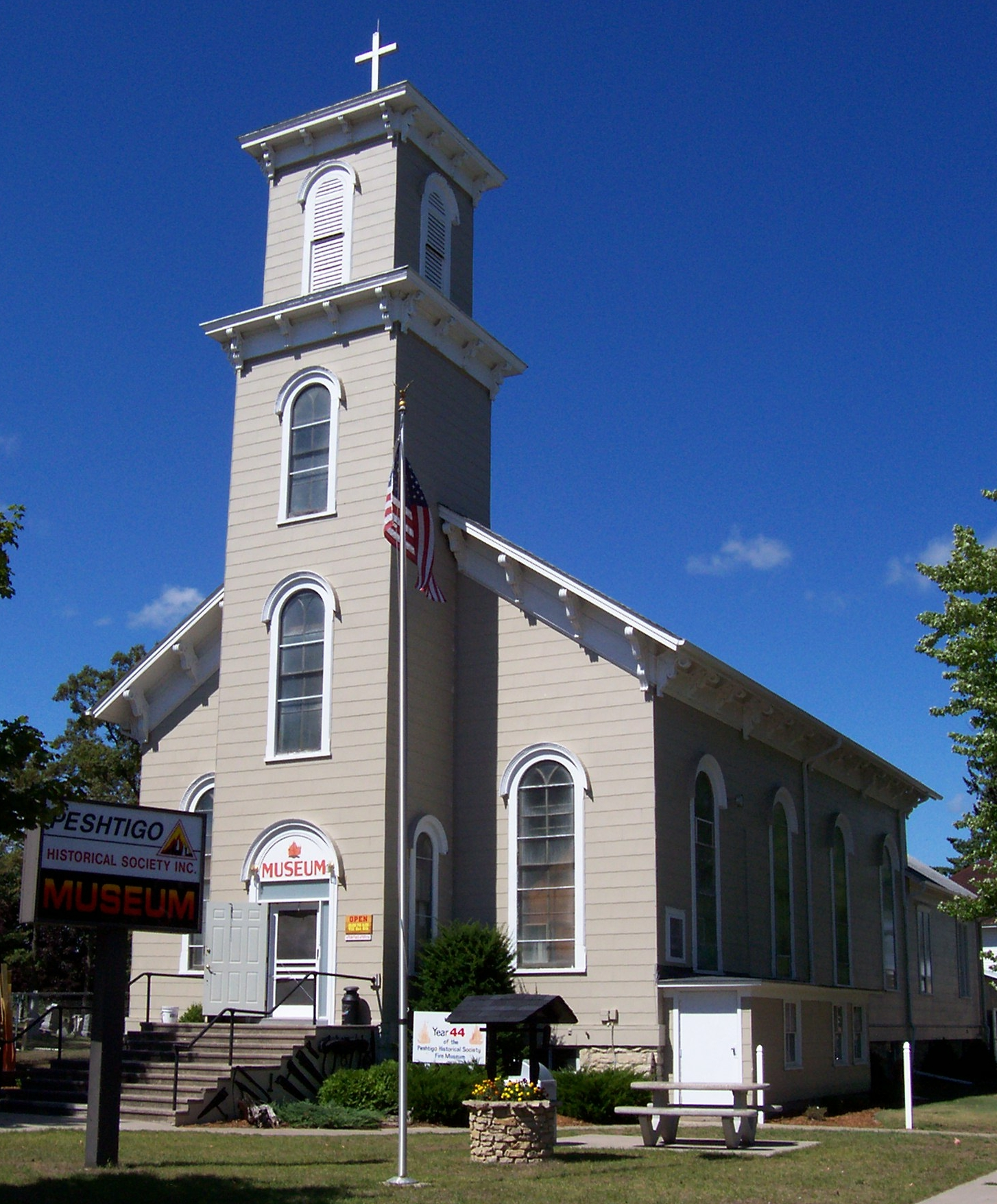
Exterior

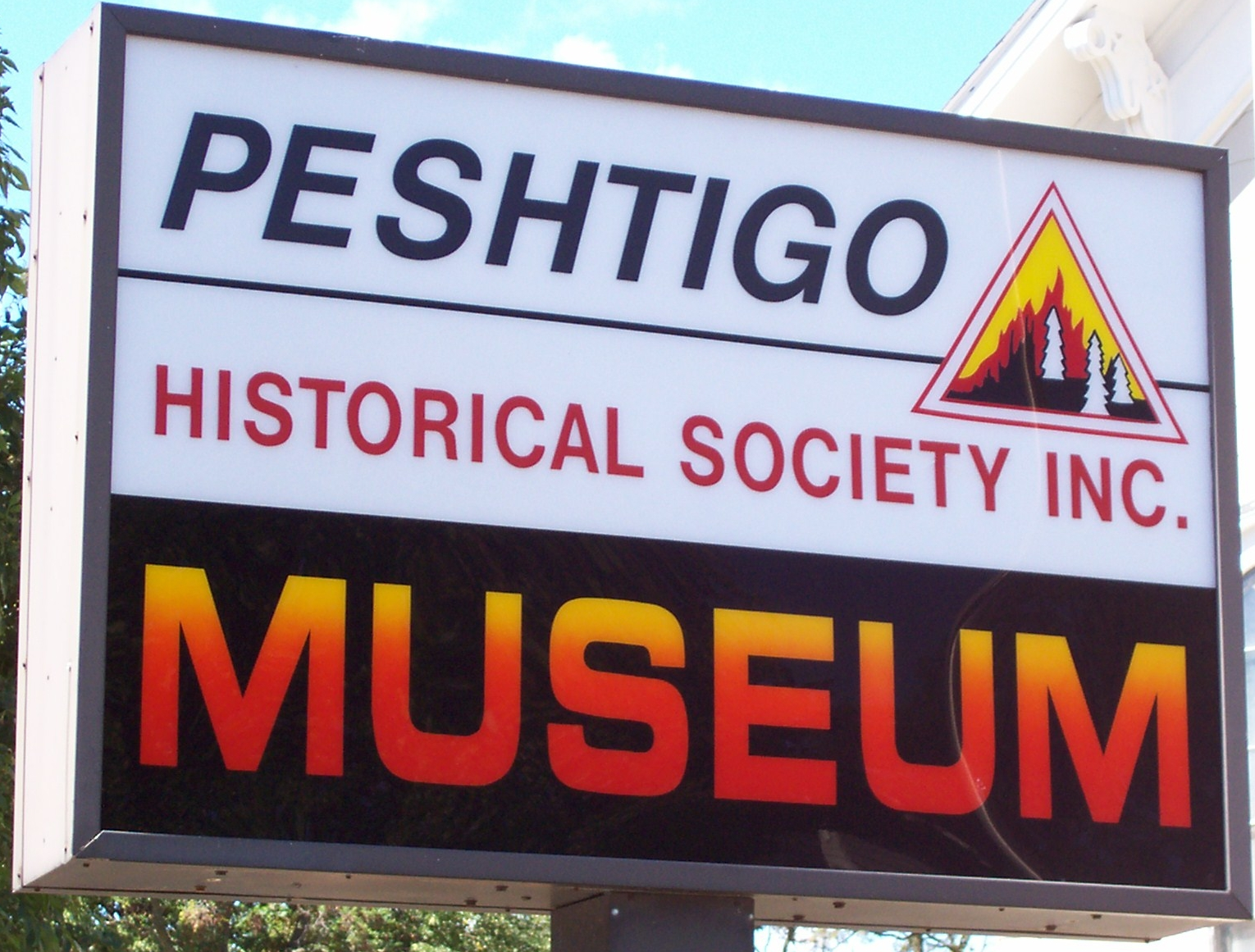
Sign

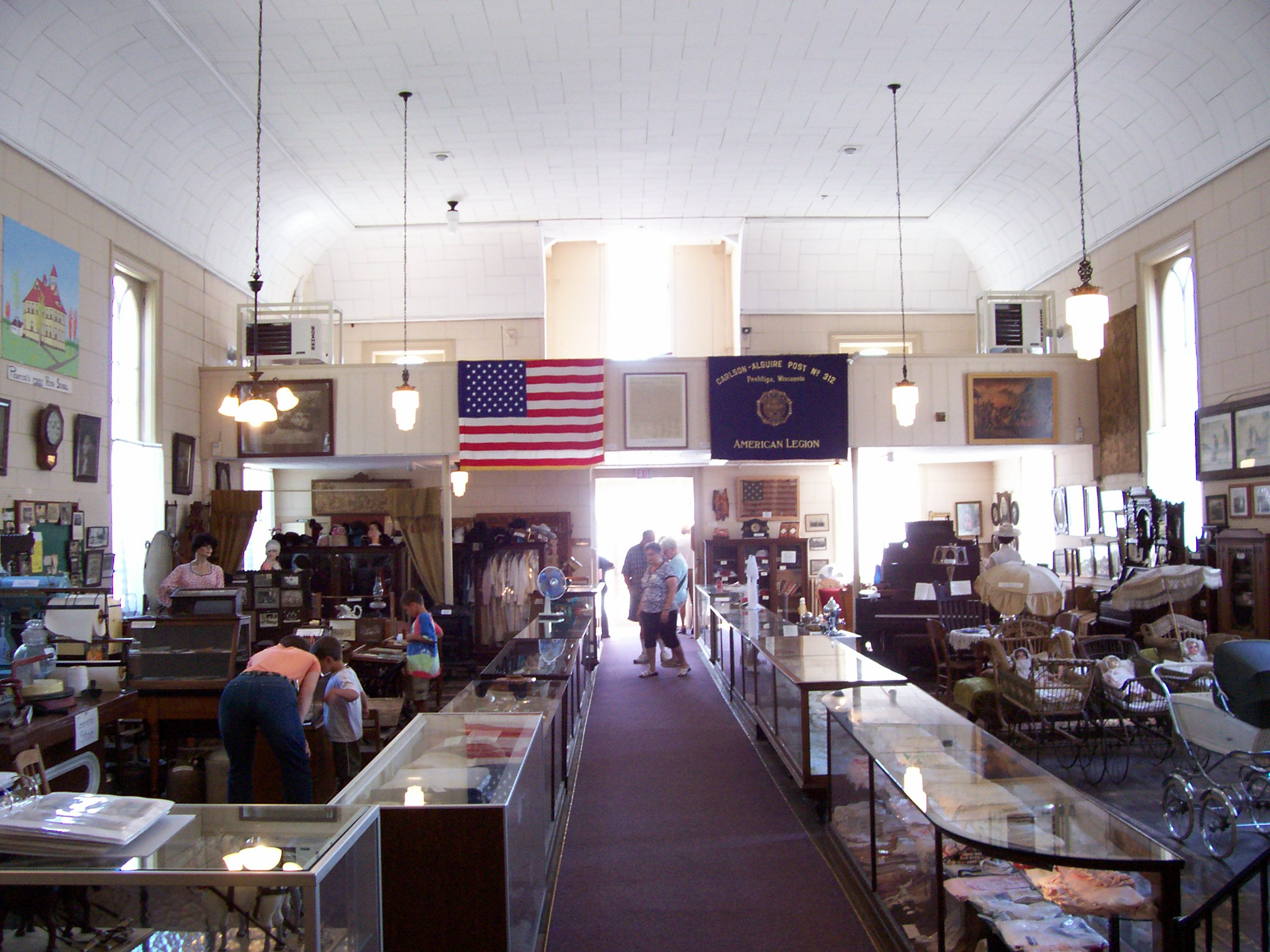
Back interior

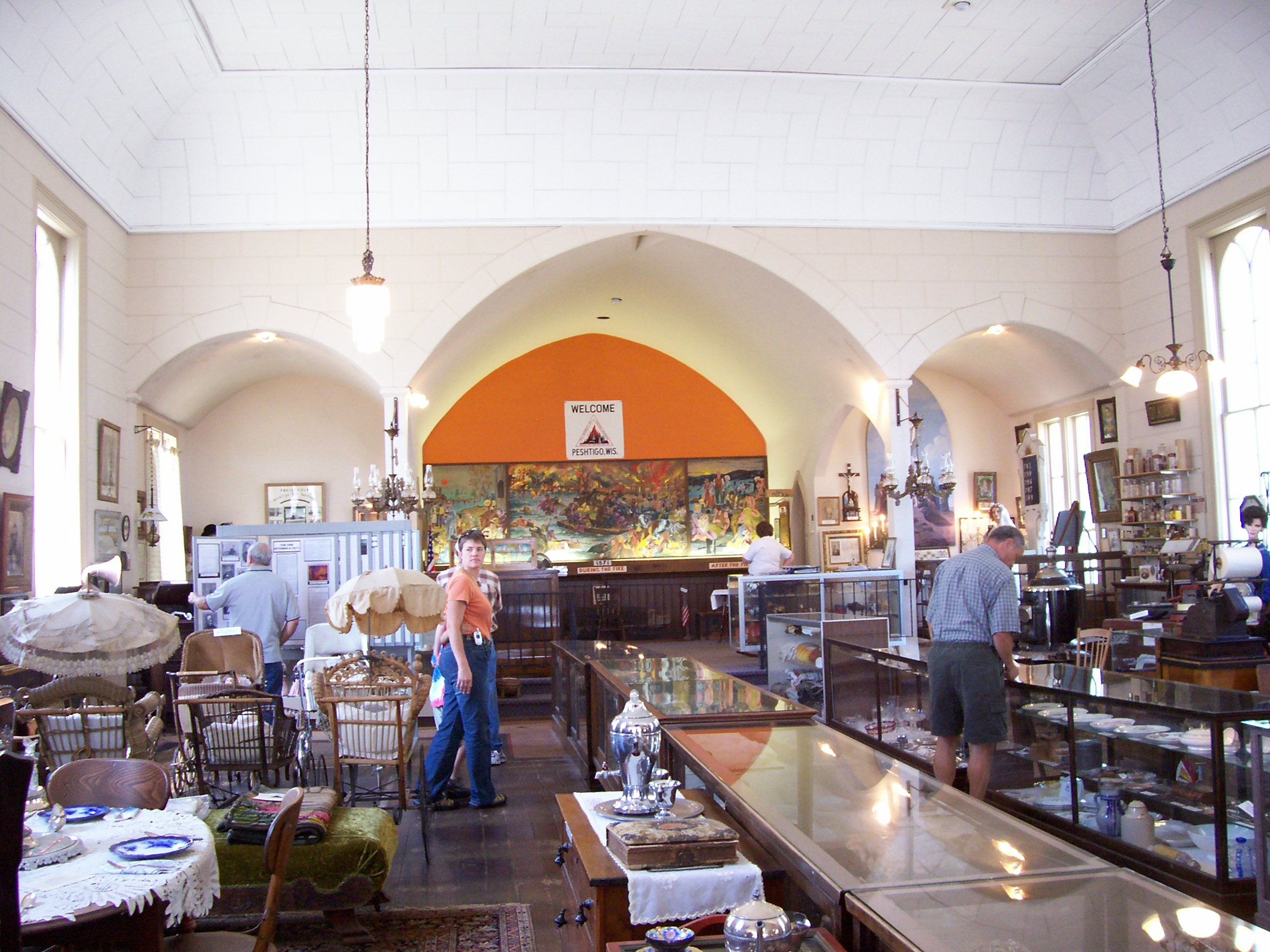
Front interior

The Peshtigo Fire Museum preserves the heritage of the Peshtigo Fire, which destroyed the city of Peshtigo, Wisconsin and surrounding area on October 8, 1871, killing over 2,000 people. It hosts storytelling, exhibits of artifacts from the fire, displays of the lifestyle at the time of the disaster, and a cemetery to memorialize those who died. The museum is adjacent to the Peshtigo Fire Cemetery, where the charred remains of over 350 people were buried in a mass grave. The cemetery is listed on the National Register of Historic Places. The memorial at the cemetery was the first official state historical marker authorized by the State Historical Society of Wisconsin.

== Collection ==
A featured item in the museum's collection is the Church tabernacle that local Roman Catholic priest Father Peter Pernin saved by submerging in the Peshtigo River. The tabernacle survived the fire unblemished. Other Peshtigo fire items include a small burned Bible and a melted glass dish discovered by a construction worker in 1995. The Bible is open to Psalms 106 and 107. Several letters with first-person accounts of the fire and cleanup are on display. One letter describes burying nine to ten hundred (900 to 1000) dead. There are several maps of Peshtigo, one before the fire and another showing the extent of the fire. A mural depicts before, during, and after the fire.

Other items that the museum features include a collection of antique items showing the history of the area. All items in the museum were donated.

== History ==
The museum is located on the site where St. Mary's Catholic Church stood before the fire. The first church to be rebuilt after the fire was a Congregational Church, across the river from the St. Mary's site and a new Catholic church later built at the St. Mary's site. The Catholic church burned again in 1927, and later rebuilt elsewhere. The Congregational church was moved across the river, by Edmund B. Dupuis, after 1927 to the St. Mary's site and that structure was converted to the museum in 1963.

== See also ==
- Fire museum
