= WDOR (AM) =

Simulcasts WDOR-FM Sturgeon Bay
- Sturgeon Bay, Wisconsin; United States
- Broadcast area: Sturgeon Bay; Green Bay
- Frequency: 910 kHz
- Branding: WDOR 93.9 FM & 910 AM

Programming
- Format: Full Service/AC
- Affiliations: ABC News Radio; Milwaukee Brewers Radio Network

Ownership
- Owner: Door County Broadcasting Co. Inc.
- Sister stations: WDOR-FM

History
- First air date: June 1, 1951
- Call sign meaning: Door County

Technical information
- Licensing authority: FCC
- Facility ID: 17307
- Class: D
- Power: 1,000 watts day 102 watts night
- Transmitter coordinates: 44°49′37.20″N 87°21′28.80″W

Links
- Public license information: Public file; LMS
- Webcast: Listen Live
- Website: wdor.com

WDOR (910 kHz) is an AM radio station licensed to Sturgeon Bay, Wisconsin, United States and serving the Sturgeon Bay, Wisconsin area, as well as the Door and Kewaunee Counties along with Green Bay to the South. The transmitter is located southwest of Sturgeon Bay, near the intersection of County Road S and Highway 42.

WDOR & WDOR-FM both broadcast a Full Service/Adult Contemporary format.

== Programming ==
Programming includes local talk shows, local news, ABC News Radio, and a music mix of Oldies, 1980s, 1990s and today's adult contemporary. Sports programming includes local high school sports, Door County League Baseball, Wisconsin Badgers Football and Basketball, and the Milwaukee Brewers.

== History ==
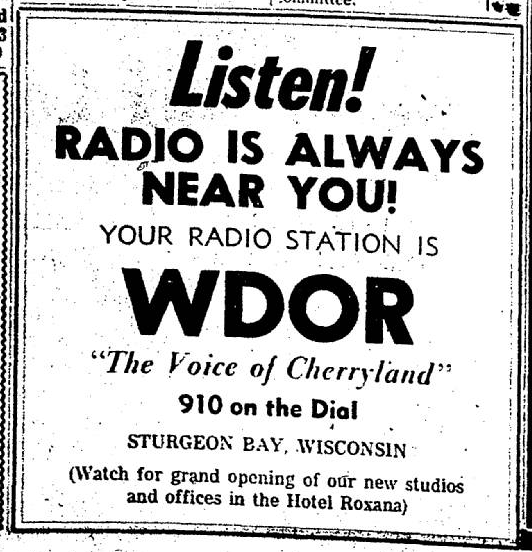
A 1958 advertisement in the Door County Advocate

WDOR-AM officially signed on the air on September 8, 1951, broadcasting at 910 kHz. The station was founded by Edward Allen Jr., a former engineer and announcer at WGN in Chicago who sought to bring a dedicated local voice to the Door Peninsula. Allen established the Door County Broadcasting Company, which has remained a family-owned entity for over seven decades, making it one of the few remaining independently owned legacy stations in the state. While WDOR-AM follows a full-service format today, its early reputation was built on highly localized segments. One of the most enduring programs was "Five Minutes with Dolores Allen," hosted by the founder’s wife. The show featured local recipes, household tips, and community gossip, running for over 50 years and becoming a cultural touchstone for Sturgeon Bay residents.

In the 1960s, WDOR-AM solidified its branding as the "Heart of the Door Peninsula." The station became a primary affiliate for the ABC Entertainment Network, providing a mix of national news and local agricultural reports vital to the region's cherry and dairy farmers. The station also maintains deep ties to local sports, famously broadcasting Door County League Baseball, a tradition that continues to draw significant local listenership during the summer months.
