= WDOR-FM =

- Sturgeon Bay, Wisconsin; United States
- Broadcast area: Sturgeon Bay; Green Bay
- Frequency: 93.9 MHz
- Branding: WDOR 93.9 FM & 910 AM

Programming
- Format: Full Service/AC
- Affiliations: ABC News Radio; Milwaukee Brewers Radio Network

Ownership
- Owner: Door County Broadcasting Co. Inc.
- Sister stations: WDOR (AM)

History
- First air date: 1966
- Former frequencies: 95.9 (1966–1973)
- Call sign meaning: Door County

Technical information
- Facility ID: 17308
- Class: C1
- ERP: 77,000 watts
- HAAT: 198 meters
- Transmitter coordinates: 44°54′21.60″N 87°22′15.60″W
- Repeater: 910 WDOR (AM) (Sturgeon Bay)

Links
- Webcast: Listen Live
- Website: wdor.com

WDOR-FM (93.9 MHz) is a radio station licensed to Sturgeon Bay, Wisconsin, United States and serving the Sturgeon Bay, Wisconsin area, as well as Door and Kewaunee Counties along with Green Bay to the South.

WDOR and WDOR-FM both broadcast a Full Service/Adult Contemporary format.

== History ==
Broadcasting first in 1951 at 910 AM and later adding an FM in 1966, originally on 95.9 before moving to its current 93.9 in 1973, WDOR has been the "Heart of the Door Peninsula" for over 50 years. Door County Broadcasting Co. Inc. and the Allen family and a few minority stockholders have owned WDOR for over half a century. On the basis of broadcast range and wattage, WDOR-FM is a regional superstation; it can also be heard across Lake Michigan in the Frankfort and Manistee, Michigan areas. The WDOR-FM tower is also shared with WRMW.

== Programming ==
Programming includes local talk shows, local news, ABC News Radio, and a music mix of Oldies, 1980s, 1990s and today's adult contemporary. Sports programming includes local high school sports, Door County League Baseball, Wisconsin Badgers Football and Basketball, and the Milwaukee Brewers.
