= WMKL =

Radio station in Hammocks–Miami, Florida

- Hammocks, Florida; United States
- Broadcast area: Miami–Fort Lauderdale area
- Frequency: 91.9 MHz (HD Radio)

Programming
- Languages: FM/HD1: English and Spanish; HD2: Spanish; HD3: English
- Format: Catholic radio (as Radio Maria USA)
- Subchannels: HD2: Spanish feed of Radio Maria USA; HD3: English feed of Radio Maria USA

Ownership
- Owner: Radio Maria Inc.

History
- Former frequencies: 91.7 MHz (1999–2010)

Technical information
- Licensing authority: FCC
- Facility ID: 61087
- Class: C2
- ERP: 50,000 watts
- HAAT: 106 meters (348 ft)
- Transmitter coordinates: 25°45′43″N 80°49′10″W

Links
- Public license information: Public file; LMS
- Webcast: Listen live (English); Listen live (Spanish)
- Website: radiomaria.us (English) www.radiomariasp.org (Spanish)

WMKL (91.9 FM) is a non-commercial radio station broadcasting a Catholic radio format owned by Radio Maria Inc. Radio Maria USA programming is originated by KJMJ 580 kHz in Alexandria, Louisiana. The station was previously owned by Call Communications Group, Inc.

Call Communications Group, Inc. was formed during the summer of 1994 by a group of college-age young adults in the Miami area. WMKL was purchased in late 1999 and began broadcasting at 8:05 p.m. on February 9, 2000. Call Communications Group owns or operates additional radio stations that serve Southwest Florida, the Glades region, and the Florida Keys. WMKL first broadcast a contemporary Christian music format before being sold to Radio Maria USA. Before the transition was made in December 2020, Radio Maria programming was heard on its HD-2 and HD-3 subchannels.

The station signed off its contemporary Christian format on December 22, 2020, at 11:59 p.m. At midnight on December 23, Radio Maria USA commenced broadcasting on WMKL's main programming frequency of 91.9.

== Radio Maria programming on WMKL in English and Spanish ==
The bilingual broadcast times on WMKL are:

- English: 3AM-3PM
- Spanish: 3PM-3AM

Click here for Radio Maria USA Spanish audistream

== See also ==
- KJMJ (Originating English language station)
