= HMWN Radio Maria =

Radio station in Canada

Coordinates: 43.7103°N 79.4704°W

HMWN Radio Maria (for Holy Mother World Networks) is a non-commercial Catholic broadcaster which operates as a closed circuit Subsidiary Communications Multiplex Operation (SCMO) and uses the subcarrier frequency of 67 kHz removed from the centre FM broadcast frequency of 102.1 MHz (CFNY-FM, a Corus Entertainment station licensed to Brampton) in Toronto, Ontario. HMWN's offices and studios are also located in Toronto.

In addition to the FM subchannel, HMWN is also being made available to digital cable providers throughout Ontario and the rest of Canada. A petition drive is now in progress by listeners and supporters asking cable providers to add HMWN to their channel spectrum. HMWN provides local Catholic programming for Toronto on weekdays into the evening hours along with the English language network feed of Radio Maria USA (originated by KJMJ 580 kHz in Alexandria, Louisiana) to provide the bulk of its overnight/early morning and weekend programming. Subchannel FM radios are available for listeners from its website. An audiostream is also provided on its website for listeners across Canada outside its Toronto signal area.

== Brief history ==
HMWN began in Toronto as an English language service on 8 May 2005, 10 years after the formation of Radio Maria Canada, an Italian and French language FM subchannel.

In 2008, HMWN was granted by the Canadian Radio-television and Telecommunications Commission (CRTC) to broadcast its local program schedule and the Radio Maria USA network feed over digital cable lines. Since CRTC rules and regulations do not allow full-time religious broadcasting of a singular denomination over conventional AM and FM frequencies, HMWM is limited to broadcasting its Catholic programming schedule in this manner as CRTC rules only allow multi-faith broadcasting. Professor Luigi Pautasso is local founder and president of both Radio Maria Canada and HMWN.

HMWN no longer exists, was amalgamated in 2016 with Radio Maria Canada.

https://www.radiomaria.ca

The World Family of Radio Maria was founded and is led by its international president Emanuele Ferarrio.

== See also ==
- Subsidiary Communications Authority
- KJMJ
- Radio Maria
