= KNIR =

Radio station in New Iberia, Louisiana

Coordinates: 30°1′32.73″N 91°49′20.42″W

Simulcast of KJMJ, Alexandria, Louisiana
- New Iberia, Louisiana; United States
- Broadcast area: New Iberia and greater Lafayette area
- Frequency: 1360 kHz

Programming
- Format: Catholic radio
- Network: Radio Maria USA

Ownership
- Owner: Radio Maria Inc.

History
- First air date: June 4, 1952
- Former call signs: KVIM (1952–1966)
- Former frequencies: 1570 kHz (1952)
- Call sign meaning: New Iberia

Technical information
- Licensing authority: FCC
- Facility ID: 6349
- Class: D
- Power: 1,000 watts day; 209 watts night

Links
- Public license information: Public file; LMS
- Webcast: Listen Live
- Website: radiomaria.us

KNIR (1360 AM; "Radio Maria") is an AM broadcasting station at 1360 kHz on the AM band licensed to New Iberia, Louisiana serving the greater Lafayette area with Catholic programming as a repeater of KJMJ (580 kHz) in Alexandria, Louisiana.

== History ==
The station began broadcasting June 4, 1952, and originally held the call sign KVIM. It briefly broadcast at 1570 kHz, before moving to 1360 kHz later in 1952. It ran 1,000 watts, and broadcast during daytime hours only. On March 1, 1966, its call sign was changed to KNIR.

KNIR at one time was an AM/FM combo in New Iberia with a country music format on AM and beautiful music on FM. Radio talk show host Jeanne Sparrow once hosted a program in the evenings and weekends on KNIR. French-language programming in Cajun and Creole dialects were also aired on KNIR in addition to being an affiliate for the Tulane Green Wave sports network. The country format remains on the FM station (now known as KXKC, owned by Cumulus Media.)

KNIR was the first AM station to simulcast KJMJ, thus forming repeater network Radio Maria USA, the English language unit of Radio Maria Inc. based in Como, Italy. Radio Maria USA consists of originator KJMJ and nine repeater stations located in Louisiana, eastern Texas, central Pennsylvania, southern Mississippi's Gulf Coast, the Door Peninsula in eastern Wisconsin and west central Ohio.

== See also ==
- KJMJ
- KBIO
- WOLM
- Radio Maria
