= Peshtigo, Wisconsin =

- City
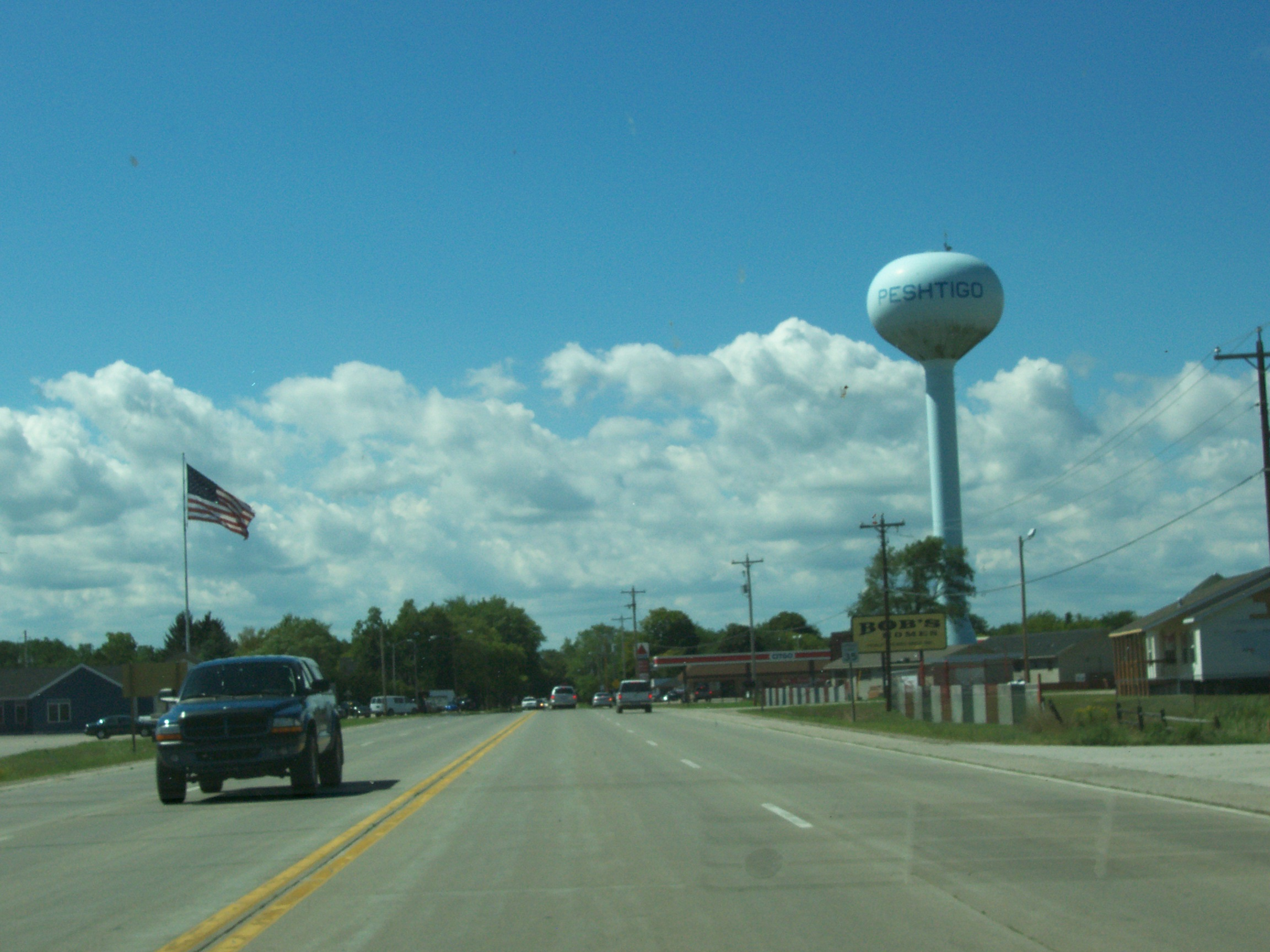
- Peshtigo from former U.S. Route 41

- Location of Peshtigo in Marinette County, Wisconsin

- Location within Wisconsin Location within the United States
- Coordinates: 45°3′14″N 87°44′46″W
- Country: United States
- State: Wisconsin
- County: Marinette

Area
  - Total: 3.08 sq mi (7.99 km^{2})
  - Land: 2.91 sq mi (7.54 km^{2})
  - Water: 0.17 sq mi (0.44 km^{2})

Population (2020)
  - Total: 3,420
  - Density: 1,148.5/sq mi (443.43/km^{2})
- Time zone: UTC-6 (Central (CST))
  - Summer (DST): UTC-5 (CDT)
- Area codes: 715 & 534
- FIPS code: 55-62175
- Website: ci.peshtigo.wi.us

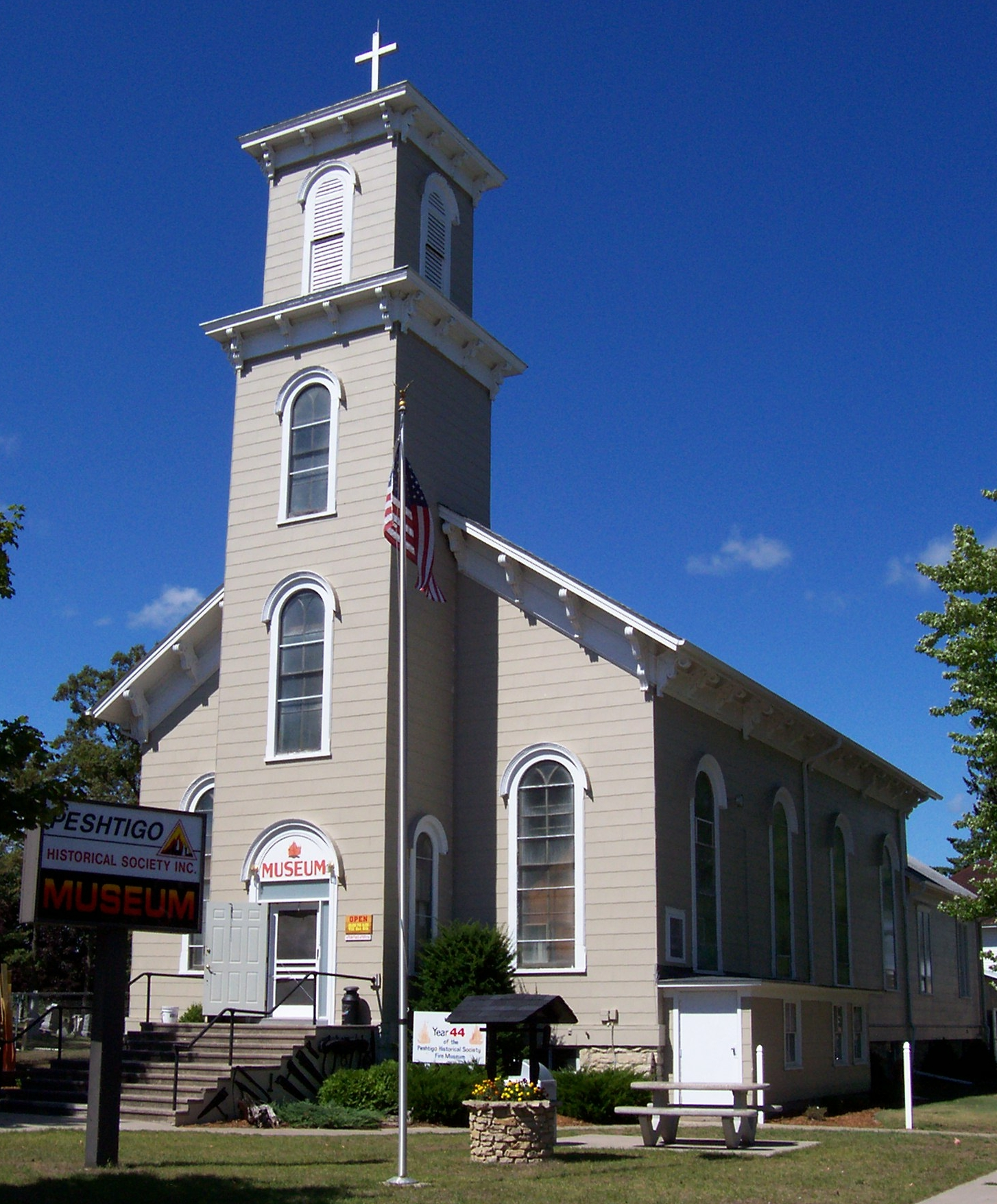
Peshtigo Fire Museum

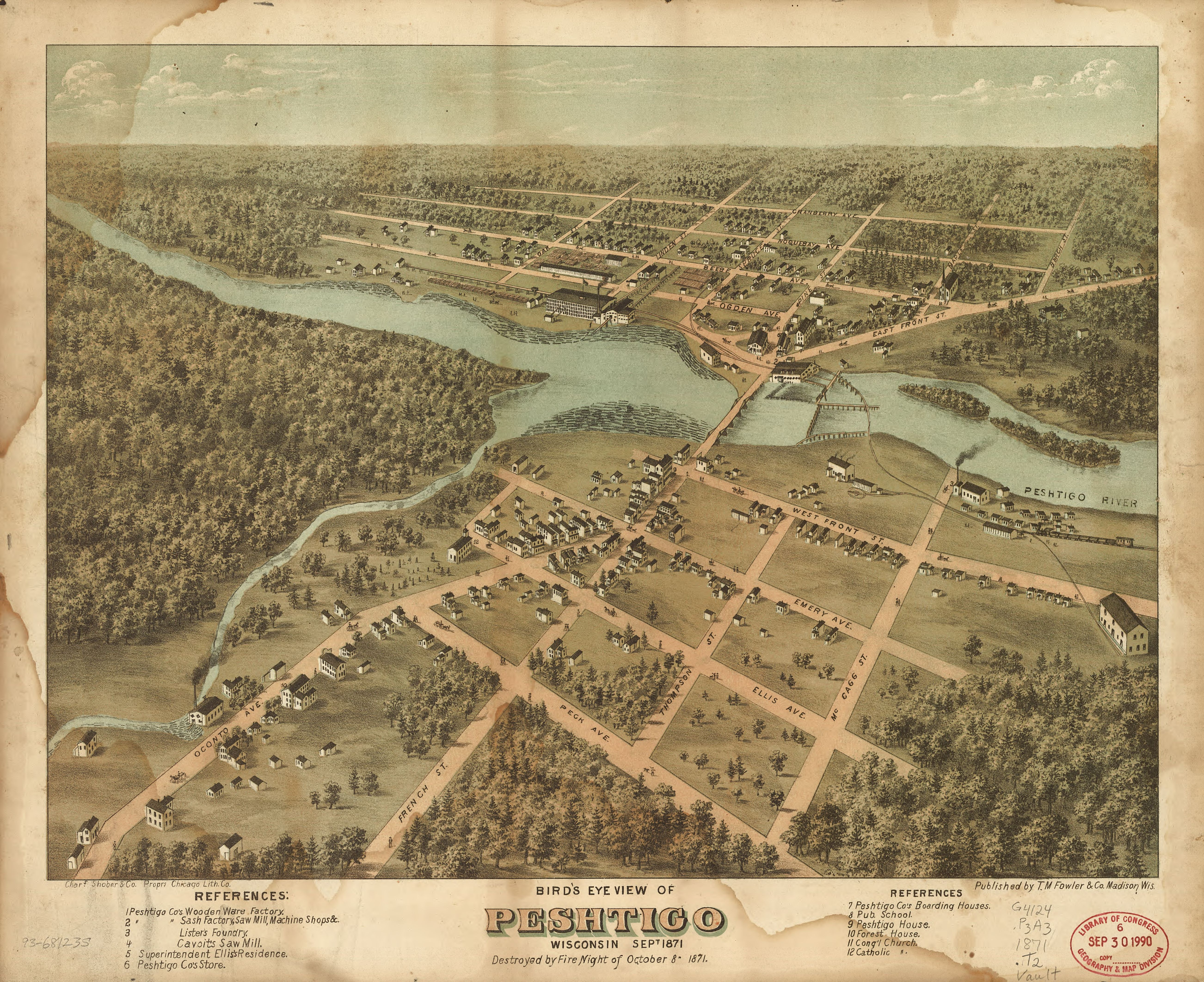
Peshtigo map before fire, September 1871

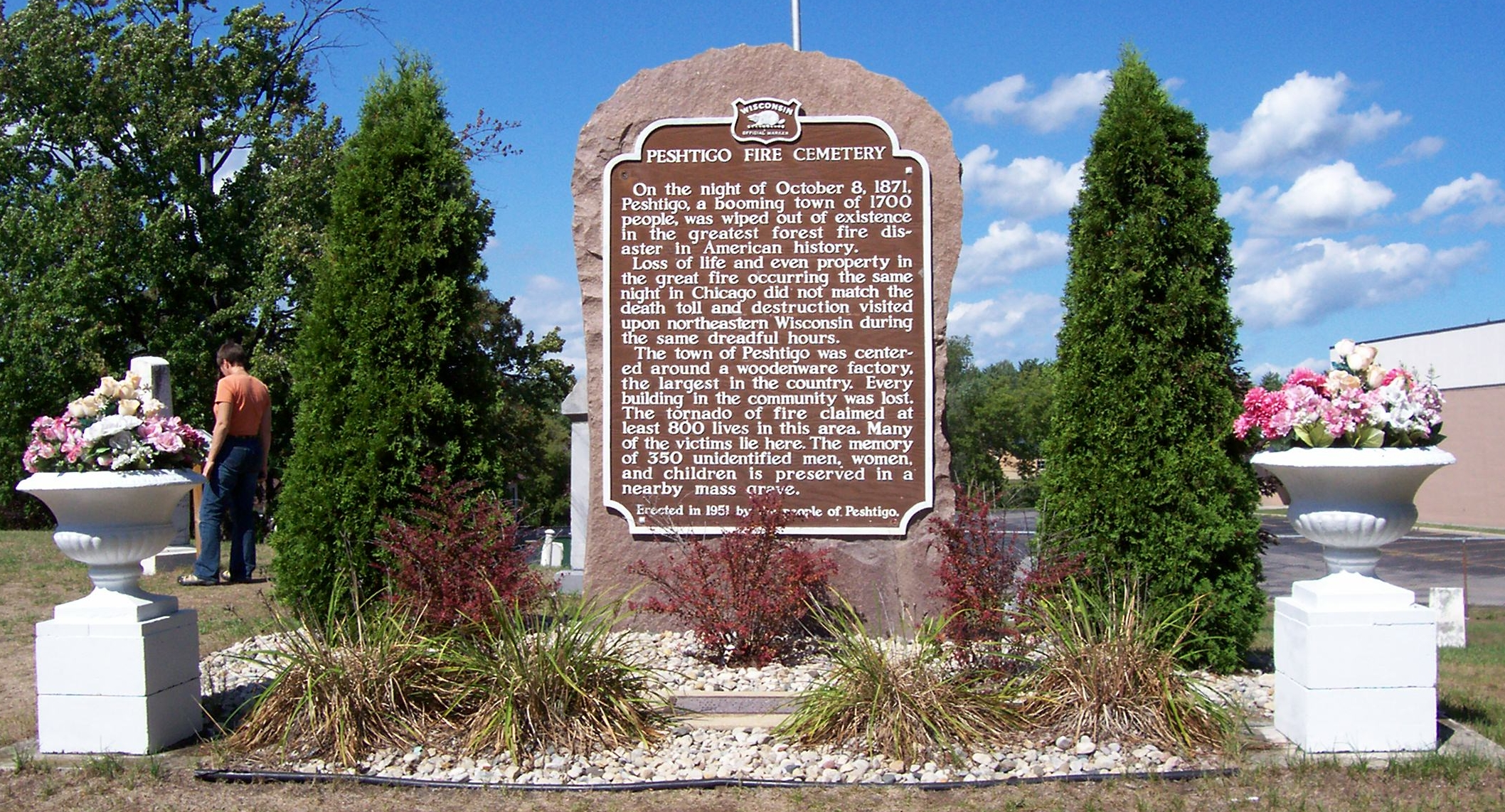
Peshtigo Fire Cemetery

Peshtigo (/ˈpɛʃtɪɡoʊ/ PESH-ti-go) is a city in Marinette County, Wisconsin, United States. The population was at 3,420 as of the 2020 census. The city is surrounded by the Town of Peshtigo. It is part of the Marinette, WI–MI Micropolitan Statistical Area. Peshtigo is known for being the site of the Peshtigo fire of 1871, in which more than 1,200 people died.

== History ==
=== Name ===
Peshtigo took its name from the nearby Peshtigo River. The etymology of Peshtigo is uncertain. Explanations include an Ojibwe word meaning 'river of the wild goose', a Menominee word for 'snapping turtle', a word meaning 'passing through a marsh', or a reference to a local Menominee band known as Pesh-tiko.

=== Peshtigo fire ===
On October 8, 1871, a forest fire driven by strong winds totally consumed Peshtigo and a dozen other villages, killing between 1,200 and 2,500 people and engulfing approximately 1.5 million acres (6,000 km^{2}). This fire, known as the Peshtigo fire, was the deadliest in American history. Unidentifiable remains of hundreds of residents were buried in a mass grave at the Peshtigo Fire Cemetery. The Peshtigo Fire Museum features several items that survived the fire, plus other artifacts from the area's history.

This fire started the same day as the Great Chicago Fire, the Holland, Michigan fire, the Port Huron Fire of 1871, and the Great Michigan Fire (in Manistee, Michigan).

== Geography and climate ==
Peshtigo is located at 45°3′13″N 87°44′45″W (45.053759, −87.746028).

According to the United States Census Bureau, the city has a total area of 3.20 square miles (8.29 km^{2}), of which 3.03 square miles (7.85 km^{2}) is land and 0.17 square miles (0.44 km^{2}) is water.

Climate data for Peshtigo, Wisconsin (1991–2020 averages)
Month	Jan	Feb	Mar	Apr	May	Jun	Jul	Aug	Sep	Oct	Nov	Dec	Year
Record high °F (°C)	57 (14)	63 (17)	82 (28)	90 (32)	97 (36)	103 (39)	108 (42)	101 (38)	98 (37)	89 (32)	75 (24)	62 (17)	108 (42)
Mean daily maximum °F (°C)	25.5 (−3.6)	29.1 (−1.6)	38.8 (3.8)	51.5 (10.8)	65.1 (18.4)	75.2 (24.0)	80.1 (26.7)	78.2 (25.7)	70.5 (21.4)	57.1 (13.9)	43.0 (6.1)	30.9 (−0.6)	53.8 (12.1)
Mean daily minimum °F (°C)	9.2 (−12.7)	10.0 (−12.2)	19.2 (−7.1)	30.2 (−1.0)	42.9 (6.1)	52.6 (11.4)	56.9 (13.8)	55.1 (12.8)	48.1 (8.9)	36.8 (2.7)	26.9 (−2.8)	16.3 (−8.7)	33.7 (0.9)
Record low °F (°C)	−30 (−34)	−30 (−34)	−20 (−29)	−6 (−21)	20 (−7)	32 (0)	40 (4)	34 (1)	21 (−6)	9 (−13)	−8 (−22)	−23 (−31)	−30 (−34)
Average precipitation inches (mm)	1.57 (40)	1.17 (30)	1.85 (47)	3.02 (77)	3.66 (93)	3.84 (98)	3.64 (92)	3.52 (89)	3.46 (88)	3.39 (86)	2.33 (59)	1.92 (49)	33.37 (848)
Average snowfall inches (cm)	13.5 (34)	10.6 (27)	6.3 (16)	4.4 (11)	0.1 (0.25)	0 (0)	0 (0)	0 (0)	0 (0)	0.1 (0.25)	2.0 (5.1)	11.9 (30)	48.9 (124)
Source: NOAA

== Demographics ==
Historical population
Census	Pop.	Note	%±
1890	1,719		—
1910	1,975		—
1920	1,440		−27.1%
1930	1,579		9.7%
1940	1,947		23.3%
1950	2,279		17.1%
1960	2,504		9.9%
1970	2,836		13.3%
1980	2,807		−1.0%
1990	3,154		12.4%
2000	3,357		6.4%
2010	3,502		4.3%
2020	3,420		−2.3%
U.S. Decennial Census

=== 2020 census ===
At the 2020 census, there were 3,420 people, and 1,413 households. The median age in Peshtigo is 37 years old. There are 33 male and 83 females under the age of 5, 109 male and 115 females that are between 5 and 9, 93 male and 111 females are between 10 and 14, 197 male and 29 females are between 15 and 19, 175 male and 136 females are between 20 and 24, 155 male and 100 females are between 25 and 29, 46 male and 65 females are between 30 and 34, 144 male and 157 females are between 35 and 39, 55 male and 19 females are between 40 and 44, 187 male and 133 females are between 45 and 49, 139 male and 58 females are between 50 and 54, 106 male and 71 females are between 55 and 59, 109 male and 86 females are between 60 and 64, 141 male and 27 females are between 65 and 69, 17 male and 0 females are between 70 and 74, 0 male and 21 females are between 75 and 79, 76 male and 125 females are between 80 and 84, and 46 male and 177 females are 85 and older.

Most of Peshtigo, at 46% is of German ancestry. 7.9% of Peshtigo are French. 5.1% are Irish. 2% are Italian. 3.1% are Norwegian. 16.7% are Polish. 1.6% are Scottish. 2% are Sub-Saharan African

The average income is $65,428. 18.9% of Peshtigo have a bachelor's degree or higher. 32% of people in Peshtigo have a high school degree. 25.2% of people have some college or no degree. 16 percenter Peshtigo has an associate degree. 11.8% of Peshtigo residents have a bachelor's degree. 7.1% of Peshtigo residents have a graduate or professional degree.

66.3% of workers in Peshtigo work for a private company. 13.2% of workers are self-employed. 14.2% are nonprofit workers. 6.3% our local, state, and federal government workers.

$662 is the median rent in Peshtigo. 6.9% of rent prices in Peshtigo are $500. 89.4% of the rent prices in Peshtigo are $500–999. 3.7% of rent prices are $1,000-1,499.

20 Peshtigo residents are Native American. 34 Peshtigo residents are Asian. 3 Peshtigo residents are Black African. 71 Peshtigo residents are Latino or Hispanic. 3,213 of Peshtigo residents are White.

=== 2010 census ===
At the 2010 census there were 3,502 people, 1,469 households, and 888 families living in the city. The population density was 1,155.8 inhabitants per square mile (446.3/km^{2}). There were 1,621 housing units at an average density of 535.0 per square mile (206.6/km^{2}). The racial makeup of the city was 96.8% White, 0.1% African American, 0.7% Native American, 1.2% Asian, 0.2% from other races, and 1.1% from two or more races. Hispanic or Latino people of any race were 1.2%.

Of the 1,469 households 30.9% had children under the age of 18 living with them, 43.2% were married couples living together, 12.3% had a female householder with no husband present, 5.0% had a male householder with no wife present, and 39.6% were non-families. 35.4% of households were one person and 14.5% were one person aged 65 or older. The average household size was 2.21 and the average family size was 2.82.

The median age was 43.2 years. 23.2% of residents were under the age of 18; 6.8% were between the ages of 18 and 24; 22.1% were from 25 to 44; 25.4% were from 45 to 64; and 22.5% were 65 or older. The gender makeup of the city was 46.9% male and 53.1% female.

=== 2000 census ===
At the 2000 census there were 3,357 people, 1,315 households, and 879 families living in the city. The population density was 1,101.8 inhabitants per square mile (425.4/km^{2}). There were 1,416 housing units at an average density of 464.8 per square mile (179.5/km^{2}). The racial makeup of the city was 98.0% White, 0.1% Black or African American, 0.5% Native American, 0.6% Asian, <0.1% Pacific Islander, 0.1% from other races, and 0.7% from two or more races. 0.7% of the population were Hispanic or Latino of any race. Of the 1,315 households 32.9% had children under the age of 18 living with them, 54.8% were married couples living together, 8.5% had a female householder with no husband present, and 33.1% were non-families. 28.7% of households were one person and 15.1% were one person aged 65 or older. The average household size was 2.39 and the average family size was 2.92.

The age distribution was 24.5% under the age of 18, 7.1% from 18 to 24, 26.8% from 25 to 44, 20.3% from 45 to 64, and 21.1% 65 or older. The median age was 40 years. For every 100 females, there were 87.8 males. For every 100 females age 18 and over, there were 84.0 males.

The median household income was $34,898 and the median family income was $41,900. Males had a median income of $31,815 versus $21,531 for females. The per capita income for the city was $16,379. About 5.6% of families and 8.2% of the population were below the poverty line, including 9.7% of those under age 18 and 4.8% of those age 65 or over.

== Education ==
The Peshtigo School District provides public education for the Peshtigo area.

St. John Lutheran School is a Pre-K–8th grade school of the Wisconsin Evangelical Lutheran Synod in Peshtigo.

Peshtigo Elementary Learning Center (PELC, or Peshtigo Elementary) is a public school that teaches Pre-K-6th grade.

Peshtigo Middle/High School is a public high school that teaches 7th to 12th grade. The districts combined have an estimated 1,250 students.

== Modern culture ==
The fictional character Caroline Duffy from the TV show Caroline in the City came from Peshtigo. The city was mentioned on the show many times.

The historical novel The Peshtigo Greenhorn was published in 2013 by Ruth H. Maxwell, providing a fictional account of the Peshtigo fire.

== Gallery ==
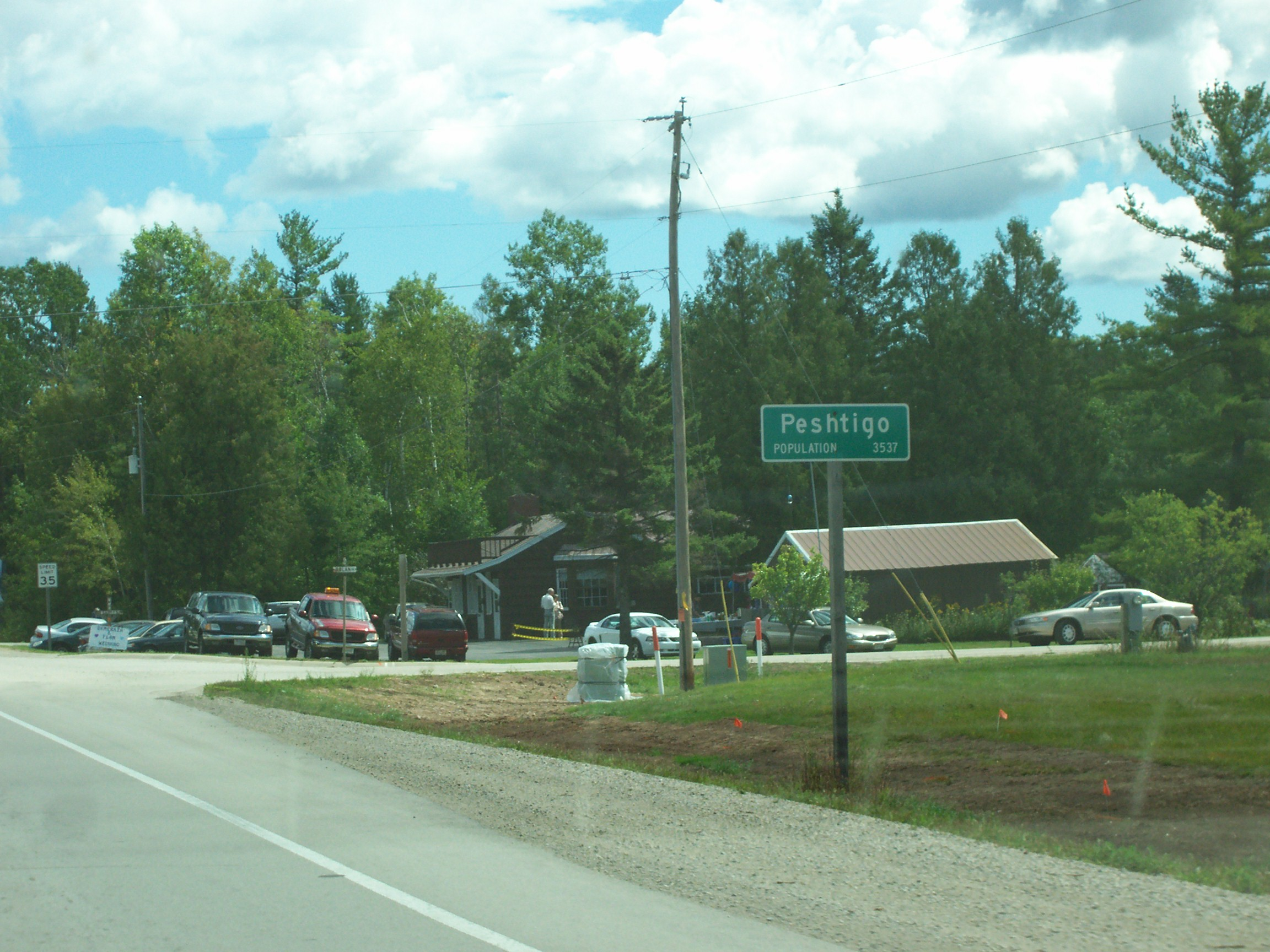
Sign depicting Peshtigo name and population

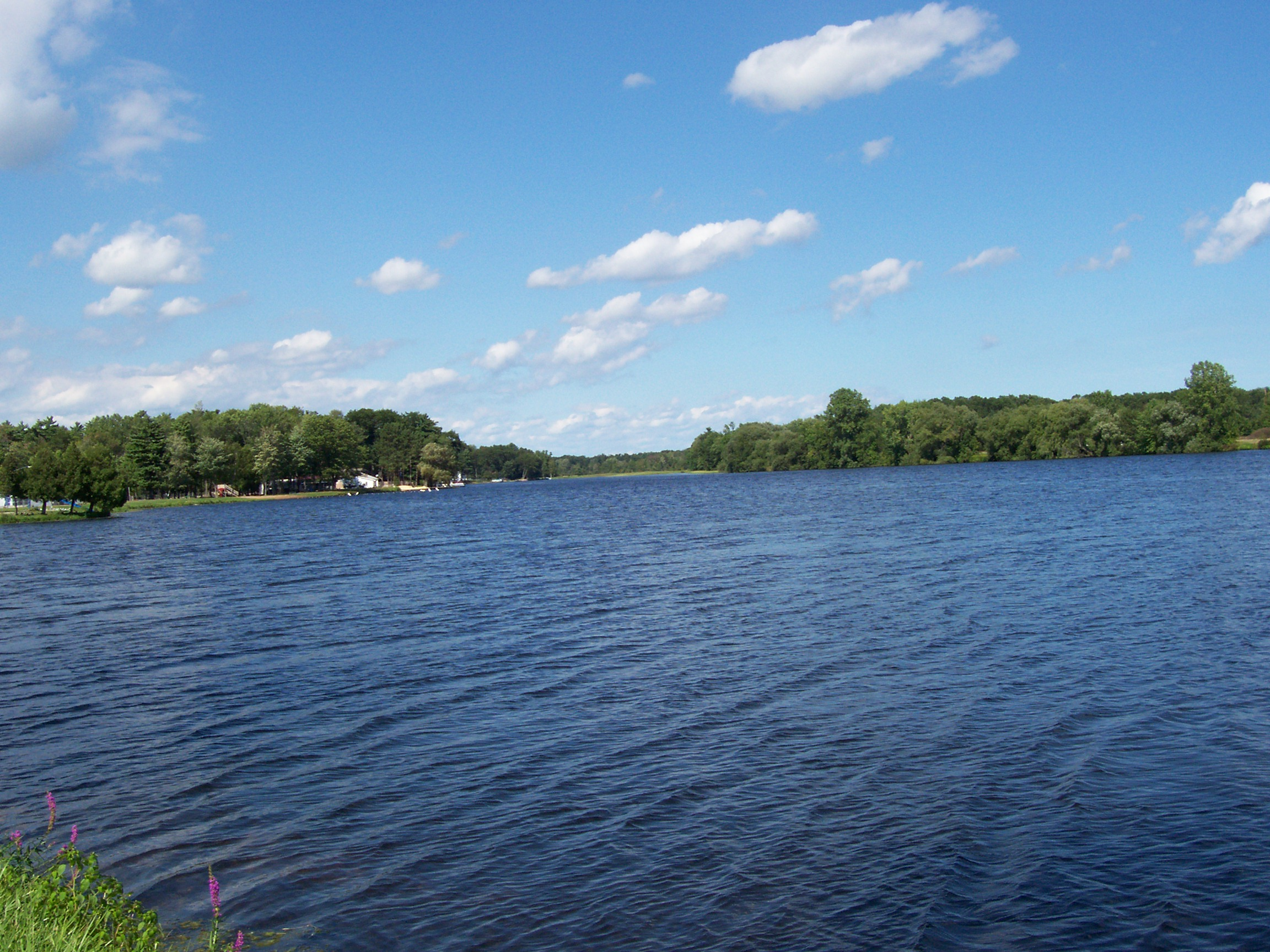
The Peshtigo River in downtown Peshtigo

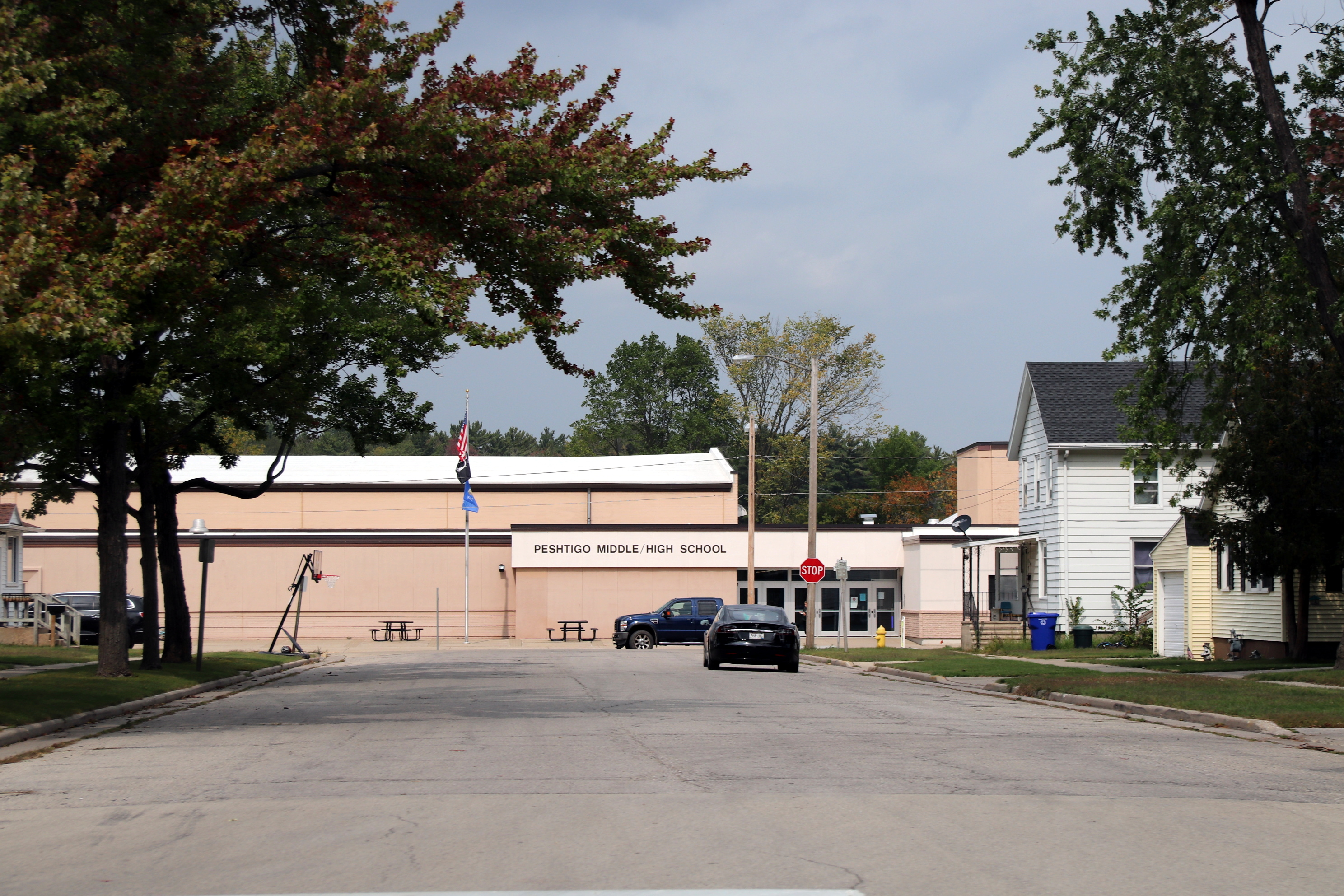
Peshtigo Middle / High School
