= Radio Maria =

Catholic radio station

Radio Maria (Note: Spanish: Radio María, Portuguese: Rádio Maria, Croatian: Radio Marija, Maltese: Radju Marija, Lithuanian: Marijos Radijas, Hungarian: Mária Rádió, Russian: Радио Мария, Ukrainian: Радіо Марія, Dutch: Radio Maria and German: Radio Horeb (Note: In Germany, it is not a translation, but rather another name.))
- Worldwide
- Frequencies: FM, AM, shortwave, cable, SCA/SCMO, DAB, DRM, DVB-T, Satellite, Sirius XM, Internet streaming

Programming
- Format: Catholic radio

Ownership
- Owner: Associazione Radio Maria (The World Family of Radio Maria)
- Sister stations: Vatican Radio

History
- First air date: 1987; 39 years ago

Links
- Webcast: America, Europe, Africa, Asia & Oceania
- Website: www.radiomaria.org

Radio Maria, formally known as The World Family of Radio Maria, is an international Catholic radio broadcasting service founded in Erba, province of Como, in the diocese of Milan, Italy, in 1987.

The World Family of Radio Maria was formed in 1998, mainly based on the Our Lady of Medjugorje apparitions and messages, and today has branches in 86 countries around the world. Its mission includes: liturgy, catechesis, spirituality, devotions, prayer, spiritual assistance with everyday issues, information, music and culture.

== History ==
Its first broadcast facility was from a parish in Arcellasco d'Erba (province of Como, Italy), but in 1987 it became a separate entity outside its home parish as an association of lay people and priests as Radio Maria Italia. In less than five years, it grew into a national Catholic radio network throughout Italy. Though not directly connected with the Roman Catholic hierarchy, it was founded as an instrument of the Church and as a tool for evangelization, implementing and adhering to the teachings of the Catholic Church. Initially it was inspired by the appeals made by the Blessed Virgin Mary in Fátima, Portugal, and in more recent years based on the Marian messages from Medjugorje, Bosnia and Herzegovina, pleading for worldwide conversion. As such, Radio Maria is not subsidized or funded by the Roman Catholic Church; instead it is underwritten by listener contributions.

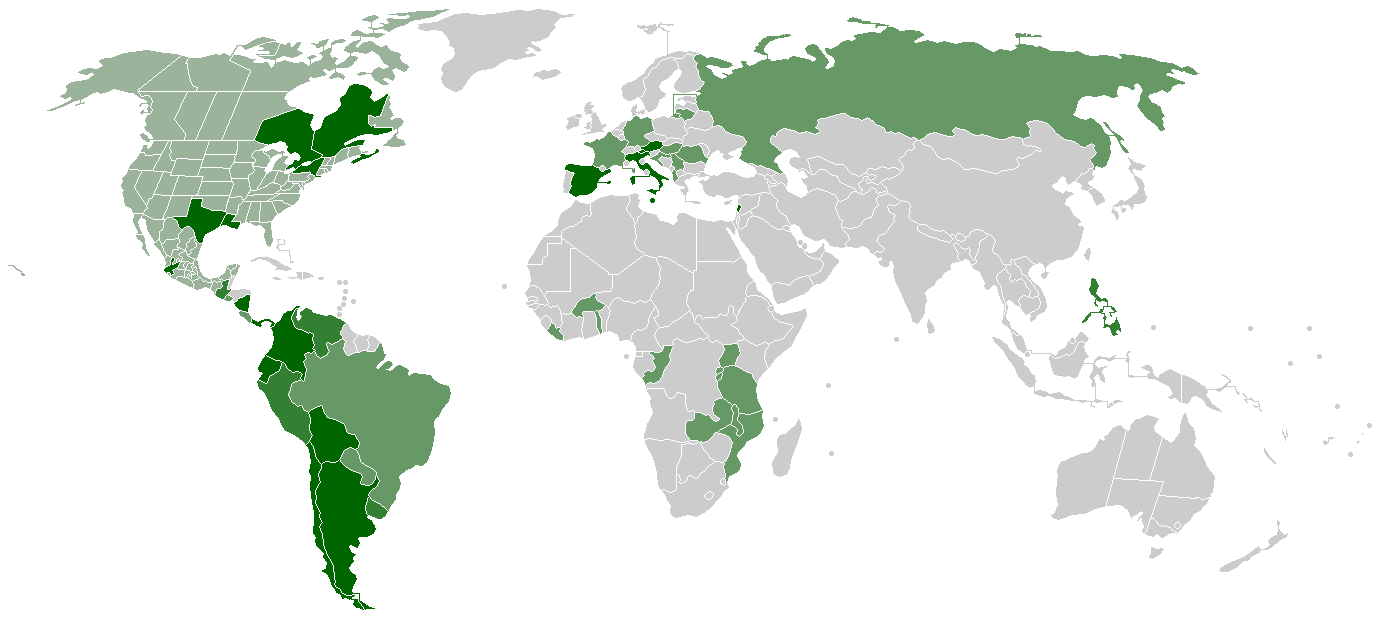
Worldwide presence of Radio Maria broadcasters.

In 1994, the principal founder don M. Galbiati left Radio Maria and founded Radio Mater, also in Arcellasco d'Erba, as a totally separate entity. Since 5 September 1994, transmissions started in Albavilla in the province of Como. The Liturgy of the Hours is diffused in the Roman Rite. Radio Mater is broadcast via radio in Italy, in Europe via satellite (DVB-S Hot Bird), and worldwide via Internet (WMP).

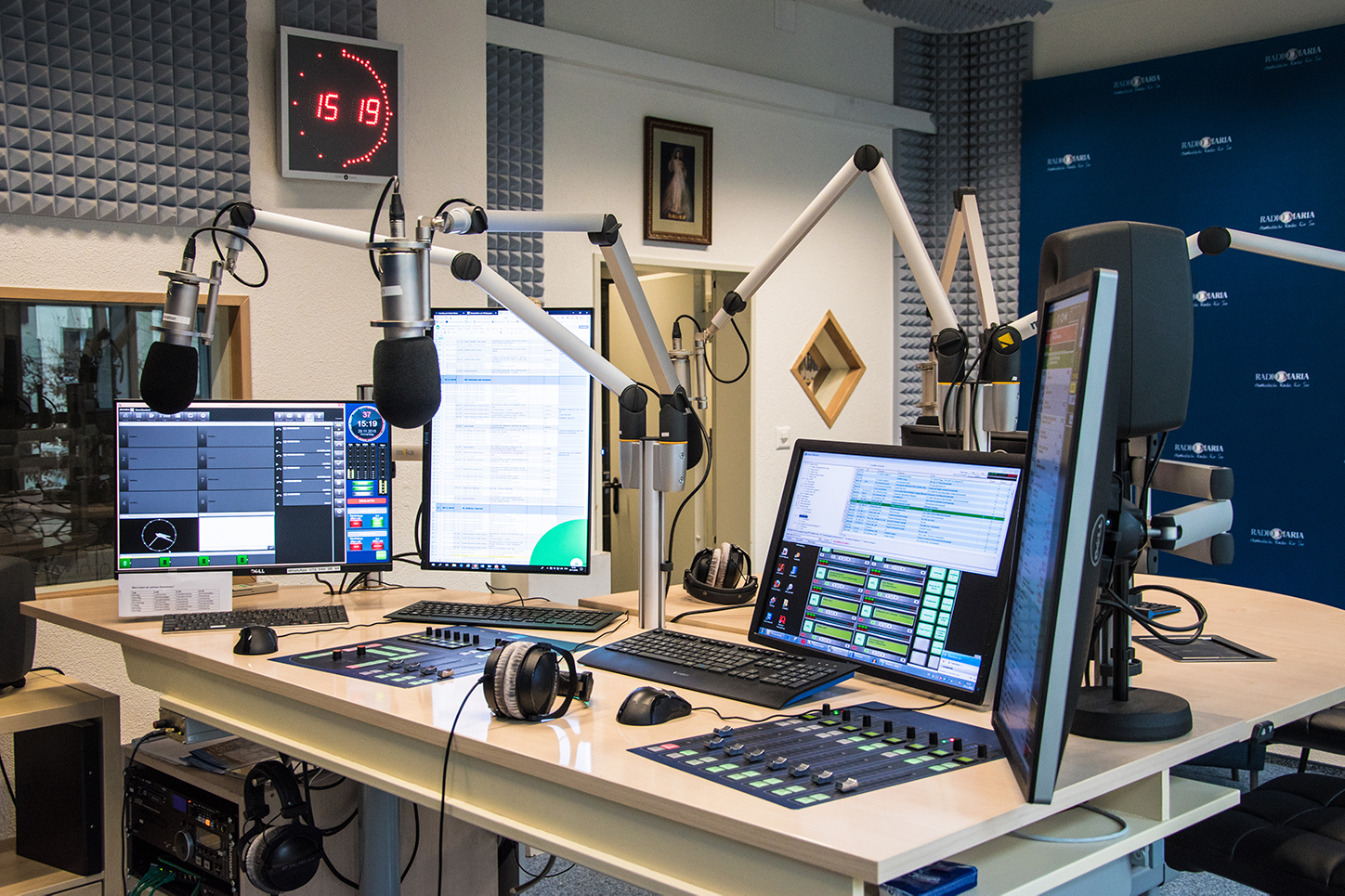
Radio Maria's studio in Switzerland.

The World Family of Radio Maria was formed in 1998 out of its subsequent international growth in the 1990s, and pursuant to the 1987 speech by Pope John Paul II in Saint Peter's Square addressing the need for a new evangelization. Emanuele Ferrario (inspired by the Pope's words to form a new evangelization) is the founder and president of Radio Maria, Inc., which has since grown into an association of 40 multilingual broadcast operations in Africa, Asia, Europe, the Middle East, and the Americas. Overall, Radio Maria operates approximately 1,500 radio transmitters worldwide.

=== Radio Maria USA ===
Its United States of America operation is one of the newest to join the World Family, in May 2000, with KJMJ (AM) in Alexandria, Louisiana, being the originating English-language station, together with a network of several FM and AM repeaters in Louisiana, an AM station in Port Arthur, Texas, on 1250 AM (KDEI), and an FM repeater in Anna, Ohio. An AM repeater in Springfield, Ohio, east of Dayton, commenced broadcasting in June 2008 with new FM repeaters in Hollidaysburg, Pennsylvania, coming on the air in June 2009, D'Iberville, Mississippi, and Peshtigo, Wisconsin, both in May 2010. Spanish-language and Italian-language programming is heard on FM subcarrier frequencies in Boston, Chicago, Houston, New York City and Washington, D.C.. Italian-language programming can also be heard on the New York City FM subcarrier as well as French Canadian and English speaking services on FM subcarriers in Toronto, Ontario. Audiostreaming is available from most of these stations.

== World Family of Radio Maria ==
=== Radio stations in Europe ===
Nation	Radio station	Language	Website	Availability	Catholic Church
Albania	Radio Maria Shqiptare	Albanian	http://www.radiomaria.al/	FM coverage in major cities of Albania	Albania
Armenia	Radio Maria Armenia	Armenian	http://www.radiomariam.am/		Armenia
Austria	Radio Maria Österreich	German	http://www.radiomaria.at/	FM in selected cities; digital and cable nationwide	Austria
Belarus	Radio Maria Belarus	Belarusian	http://www.radiomaria.by/	Internet streaming	Belarus
Belgium	Radio Maria België	Dutch	http://www.radiomaria.be/	FM and DAB+ coverage of Flanders (Belgium)	Belgium
Bosnia and Herzegovina	Radio Marija BiH	Croatian	http://www.radiomarija.ba/	FM in Sarajevo and Banja Luka	Bosnia and Herzegovina
Croatia	Radio Marija Hrvatska	Croatian	http://www.radiomarija.hr/	FM in Zagreb, Split and Virovitica	Croatia
France	Radio Maria France	French	http://www.radiomaria.fr/	1467 AM in Southern France, 95.4 FM in Monaco	France
Germany	Radio Horeb	German	http://www.horeb.org/	Affiliate station. FM in selected areas; DAB+ and cable nationwide	Germany
Hungary	Mária Rádió Magyarország	Hungarian	http://www.mariaradio.hu/	FM national coverage	Hungary
Ireland	Radio Maria Ireland	English	http://www.radiomaria.ie/	Saorview (digital terrestrial television) channel 210	Ireland
Italy	Radio Maria Italia	Italian	http://www.radiomaria.it/	FM national coverage in Italy, parts of Switzerland and Austria; FM coverage in major cities of Albania. DAB+ and DVB-T coverage in selected areas in Italy.	Italy
Italy	Radio Maria Südtirol	German	http://www.radiomaria.bz.it/	FM coverage in South Tyrol (Italy) and Tyrol (Austria)	South Tyrol
Kosovo	Radio Maria Kosovë	Albanian	http://www.radiomariakosove.org/		Kosovo
Latvia	Radio Marija Latvija	Latvian	http://www.rml.lv/	FM coverage (93.2 FM in Valka, 97.0 FM in Krāslava, 97.1 FM in Liepāja, 97.3 FM in Rīga, 106.0 FM in Cēsis)	Latvia
Lithuania	Marijos Radijas Lietuva	Lithuanian	http://www.marijosradijas.lt/	FM national coverage	Lithuania
Malta	Radju Marija Malta	Maltese	http://www.radjumarija.org/	FM national coverage (102.3 FM in Malta, and 107.8 in Gozo). DAB+	Malta
Monaco	Radio Maria Monaco	Italian	http://www.radiomaria.it/	FM national coverage	Monaco
Netherlands	Radio Maria Nederland	Dutch	http://www.radiomaria.nl/	DAB+ national coverage, and internet	Netherlands
North Macedonia	Радио Марија Македонија	Macedonian	http://www.radiomarija.mk/	FM in Strumica	North Macedonia
Portugal	Rádio Maria Portugal	Portuguese	http://www.radiomaria.pt/	FM national coverage (102.2 FM in Lisbon, 100.8 FM in Porto and 97.5 FM in Alentejo)	Portugal
Romania	Radio Maria România	Romanian	http://www.radiomaria.ro/	FM in Transylvania and Moldova	Romania
Romania	Mária Rádió Erdély	Hungarian	http://www.radiomaria.ro/	FM in Transylvania	Romania
Russia	Радио Мария	Russian	http://www.radiomaria.ru/	Internet streaming	Russia
San Marino	Radio Maria San Marino	Italian	http://www.radiomaria.it/	FM national coverage	San Marino
Serbia	Radio Marija Srbija	Serbian	http://www.radiomarija.rs/	FM in some cities, mainly in Vojvodina, but also in the south and southeast of the country	Serbia
Serbia	Mária Rádió Szerbia	Hungarian	http://www.mariaradio.rs/	FM in some cities, mainly in Vojvodina, but also in the south and southeast of the country	Serbia
Slovakia	Rádio Mária Slovensko	Slovak	https://www.radiomaria.sk/	FM and online	Slovakia
Spain	Radio María España	Spanish	http://www.radiomaria.es/	DAB+ and FM national coverage in Spain and Andorra	Spain
Switzerland	Radio Maria Deutschschweiz	German	http://www.radiomaria.ch/ http://www.radiomaria-sr.ch/ (in French)	DAB+ and cable in the German-speaking part of Switzerland	Switzerland
Ukraine	Радіо Марія	Ukrainian	http://www.radiomaria.org.ua/	69.68 FM (OIRT band) in Kyiv	Ukraine
United Kingdom	Radio Maria England	English	http://radiomariaengland.uk/	DAB+ in London, DAB in Cambridgeshire, DAB+ in Bristol	United Kingdom
Vatican City	Radio Maria Italia	Italian	http://www.radiomaria.it/	FM national coverage	Vatican State

=== Radio stations in Asia ===
Nation	Radio Station	Language	Website	Availability	Catholic Church
Indonesia	Radio Maria Indonesia	Indonesian	http://www.radiomaria.co.id/	104.2 FM in Medan, North Sumatra	Indonesia
Iraq	Radio Mariam Erbil	Arabic	http://www.radiomariam.iq/	104.9 FM in Erbil	Iraq
Israel	Radio Maria Nazareth – Holy Land	Arabic	http://www.radiomariam.org.il/		Israel
India	Radio Maria India	English	http://www.radiomaria.org.in/		India
Lebanon	Radio Maria Liban	Arabic	https://www.radiomaria.org.lb/		Lebanon
Macau	Radio Maria Macau	Chinese	http://www.radiomaria.mo/		Macau
Philippines	Radio Maria Philippines	English	http://www.radiomaria.ph/	FM in 4 cities, mainly on Luzon Island; cable coverage in selected areas, Cignal Channel 315	Philippines
Philippines	Radyo Maria Pilipinas	Filipino	http://www.radiomaria.ph/	FM in 4 cities, mainly on Luzon Island; cable coverage in selected areas, Cignal Channel 315	Philippines
Middle East	Radio Mariam	Arabic	http://www.radiomariam.org/	Internet radio	Middle East

=== Radio stations in Oceania ===
Nation	Radio Station	Language	Website	Availability	Catholic Church
Papua New Guinea	Radio Maria Papua New Guinea	English	http://www.radiomariapng.org/	FM national coverage and Shortwave	Papua New Guinea
Australia	Radio Maria Australia	English	http://www.radiomaria.org.au/	DAB+ in Sydney and Melbourne	Australia

=== Radio stations in Africa ===
Nation	Radio station	Language	Website	Availability	Catholic Church
Angola	Radio Maria Angola	Portuguese	https://www.radiomaria.co.ao/		Angola
Burkina Faso	Radio Maria Burkina Faso	French	http://www.radiomariaburkinafaso.org/	91.6 FM in Ouagadougou, 96.9 FM in Koupéla	Burkina Faso
Burundi	Radio Maria Burundi	French	http://www.radiomaria.bi/	FM in major cities	Burundi
Cameroon	Radio Maria Cameroon	French	http://www.radiomaria.cm/		Cameroon
Central African Republic	Radio Maria Centrafrique	French	http://www.radiomariacentrafrique.org/	FM in major cities	Central African Republic
Democratic Republic of the Congo	Radio Maria RDC, Kinshasa; Radio Maria RDC, Bukavu; Radio Maria RDC, Goma; Radio Maria RDC, Kananga	French Lingala Swahili Luba-Lulua	http://www.radiomaria.cd/		Democratic Republic of the Congo
Equatorial Guinea	Radio María Guinea Ecuatorial	Spanish	http://www.radiomaria.gq/		Equatorial Guinea
Gabon	Radio Maria Gabon	French	http://www.radiomariagabon.org/	FM in major cities	Gabon
Guinea	Radio Voix de la Paix	French	https://www.radiovoixdelapaix.org/	FM in major cities (Conakry 100,7 FM)	Guinea
Ivory Coast	Radio Maria Côte d'Ivoire	French	http://www.radiomaria.ci/	FM in major cities	Ivory Coast
Kenya	Radio Maria Kenya	English	http://www.radiomaria.co.ke/	88.1 FM in Murang'a	Kenya
Lesotho	Radio Maria Lesotho	English	https://www.radiomaria.co.ls/	FM national coverage	Lesotho
Liberia	Radio Maria Liberia	English	https://www.radiomaria.com.lr/		Liberia
Madagascar	Radio Maria Madagascar	French	http://www.radiomaria.mg/		Madagascar
Malawi	Radio Maria Malawi	Chichewa Chiyao Chitumbuka English	http://www.radiomaria.mw/		Malawi
Mozambique	Rádio Maria Moçambique	Portuguese	http://www.radiomaria.org.mz/	FM in major cities	Mozambique
Republic of the Congo	Radio Maria Congo	French	http://www.radiomaria.cg/	FM in major cities	Republic of the Congo
Rwanda	Radio Maria Rwanda	Kinyarwanda French English	http://www.radiomaria.rw/	FM national coverage	Rwanda
Sierra Leone	Radio Maria Sierra Leone	English	http://www.radiomaria.sl/	FM in major cities	Sierra Leone
South Africa	Radio Veritas	English	http://www.radioveritas.co.za/	Affiliate station. 576 AM in Meyerton	South Africa
Tanzania	Radio Maria Tanzania	English Swahili	http://www.radiomaria.co.tz/	FM in major cities	Tanzania
Togo	Rádio Maria Togo	French	http://www.radiomaria.tg/	FM in major cities	Togo
Uganda	Radio Maria Uganda	English Luganda	http://www.radiomaria.ug/	FM in major cities	Uganda
Zambia	Radio Maria Zambia	English	https://www.radiomaria.co.zm/	FM in major cities, covering also areas of Malawi and Mozambique	Zambia

=== Radio stations in the Americas ===
Nation	Radio station	Language	Website	Availability	Catholic Church
Argentina	Radio María Argentina	Spanish	http://www.radiomaria.org.ar/	AM and FM national coverage	Argentina
Bolivia	Radio María Bolivia	Spanish	http://www.radiomaria.org.bo/	FM national coverage	Bolivia
Brazil	Rádio Maria Brasil	Portuguese	http://www.radiomaria.org.br/	99.9 FM in Goiânia	Brazil
Canada	Radio Maria Canada	Italian Spanish	http://www.radiomaria.ca/	FM subcarriers in Montréal (CIRA-FM 91.3) and Toronto (CHIN-FM 100.7)	Canada
Canada	HMWN Radio Maria	English	http://www.radiomaria.ca/	FM subcarrier in Toronto (CFNY-FM 102.1)	Canada
Chile	Radio María Chile	Spanish	http://www.radiomaria.cl/	FM national coverage	Chile
Colombia	Radio María Colombia	Spanish	http://www.radiomariacol.org/	AM in major cities	Colombia
Costa Rica	Radio María Costa Rica	Spanish	http://www.radiomaria.cr/	610 AM in San José	Costa Rica
Dominican Republic	Radio María República Dominicana	Spanish	http://www.radiomaria.org.do/	1240 AM in Santo Domingo	Dominican Republic
Ecuador	Radio María Ecuador	Spanish	http://www.radiomariaecuador.org/	FM national coverage	Ecuador
El Salvador	Radio María El Salvador	Spanish	http://www.radiomaria.org.sv/	810 AM nationwide and 107.3 FM in San Salvador	El Salvador
Guatemala	Radio María Guatemala	Spanish	http://www.radiomaria.org.gt/	FM national coverage	Guatemala
Honduras	Radio María Honduras	Spanish	https://www.radiomaria.hn/	FM national coverage	Honduras
Mexico	Radio María México	Spanish	https://radiomaria.mx/	Multiple stations, most owned by Fundación Cultural para la Sociedad Mexicana	Mexico
Nicaragua	Radio María Nicaragua	Spanish	http://www.radiomaria.org.ni/	1400 AM Managua, FM in major cities	Nicaragua
Panama	Radio María Panamá	Spanish	http://www.radiomaria.pa/	FM national coverage	Panama
Paraguay	ZPV137 Radio María Paraguay	Spanish	http://www.radiomaria.org.py/	107.3 FM in Areguá	Paraguay
Puerto Rico	Radio María Puerto Rico	Spanish	https://www.radiomariapr.org/	FM national coverage	Puerto Rico
Peru	Radio María Perú	Spanish	http://www.radiomariaperu.org/	FM national coverage	Peru
Uruguay	Radio María Uruguay	Spanish	http://www.radiomaria.org.uy/	FM in major cities, 1470 AM in Melo	Uruguay
USA	Radio Maria United States	English	http://www.radiomaria.us/	AM and FM in Louisiana, Mississippi, Ohio, Pennsylvania, Texas and Wisconsin; FM HD3 affiliate in Miami, Florida (programming originates from station KJMJ.)	United States of America
USA	Radio Maria Stati Uniti	Italian	http://nyi.radiomaria.us/	FM subcarriers in NYC, Chicago and Bridgeport	United States of America
USA	Radio María Estados Unidos	Spanish	http://www.radiomariasp.org/	FM subcarriers in Boston, NYC, Washington, Chicago and Houston	United States of America
Venezuela	Radio María Venezuela	Spanish	http://www.radiomaria.org.ve/	1450 AM in Caracas	Venezuela

== Programming ==
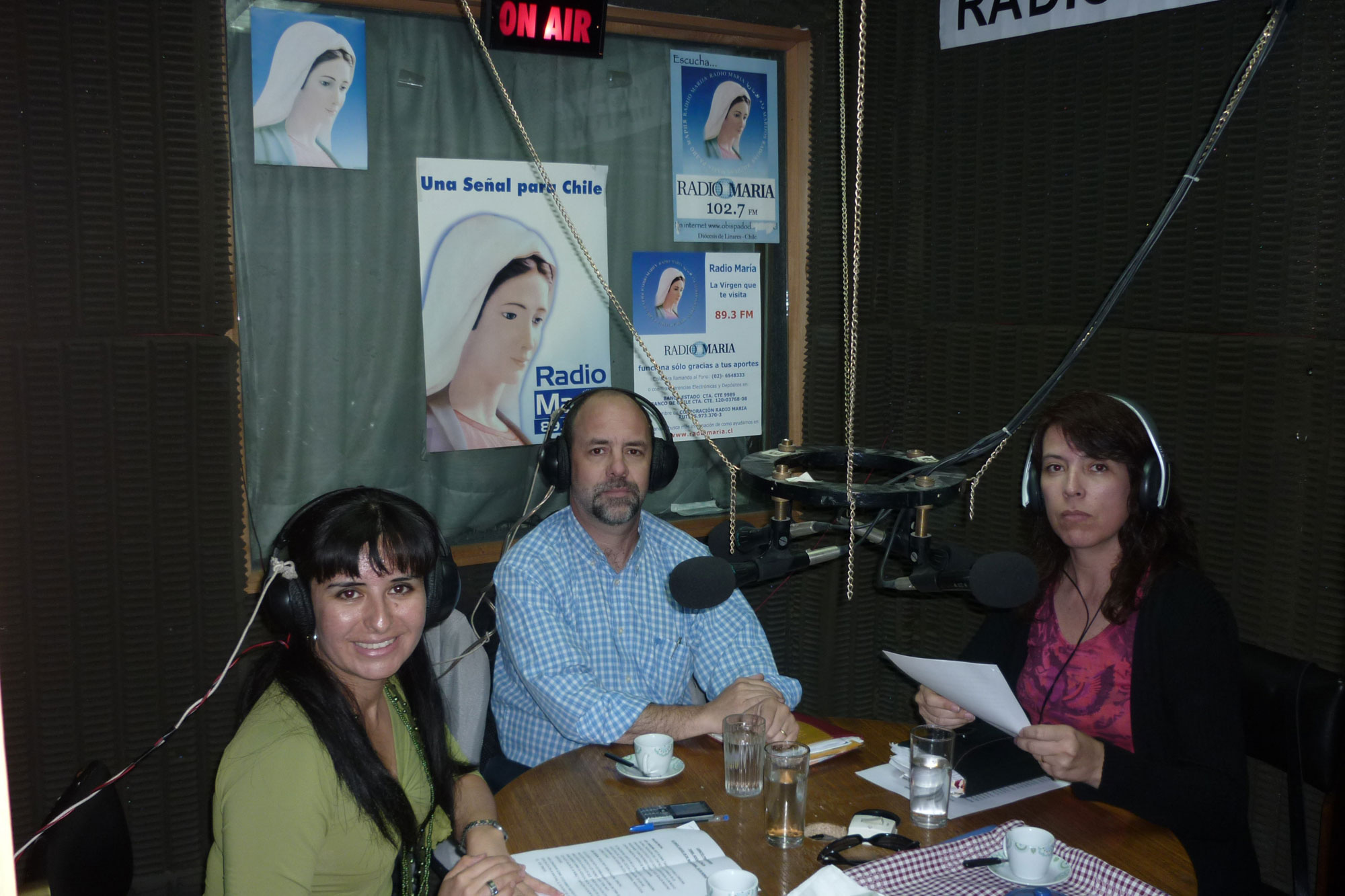
Radio Maria's studio in Chile.

Programming mostly consists of traditional Catholic worship music, but some stations also air a mix of traditional and contemporary Catholic music, along with various talk and teaching programs discussing the Catholic faith, frequent recitals of the Holy Rosary, novenas, and Masses.

== Facilities ==
Radio Maria's programming mostly emanates from one centrally located studio or station in a given region or country, and is then re-broadcast (or "simulcast") on a network of repeater transmitters on the AM and FM bands. Some employ the use of a subcarrier, also known as SCA (for "Subsidiary Communications Authority") facilities of FM stations, requiring the use of a receiver designed to receive SCA signals. Since the emergence of the internet, audio-streaming has been used extensively as a means to help fill in gaps left by the unavailability of AM or FM frequencies in metropolitan areas already taken up by commercial, public, or other religious broadcasters.

Starting in June 2008, there have been shortwave transmissions originating from Italy at 26 MHz and at 26.01 MHz DRM making it the only (and last) shortwave service originating in Italy besides Vatican Radio. There are presently no commercial satellite radio subscription services (such as Sky Digital, Sirius or XM) of Radio Maria. However, its Spanish-language, Italian-language, and Polish-language stations may be available in some areas served by the Dish Pronto division of Dish Network, a satellite television subscription service.

== See also ==
- Blessed Virgin Mary
- Christian radio
- Contemporary Catholic music
- List of religious radio stations
- Roman Catholic Church
