= 2019 in American television =

In American television in 2019, notable events included television show debuts, finales, and cancellations; channel launches, closures, and re-brandings; stations changing or adding their network affiliations; and information about controversies and carriage disputes.

== Notable events ==
=== January ===
Date	Event	Source
2	Tribune Media removes their broadcast stations, subchannels, and cable network WGN America from Spectrum systems in several markets due to the lack of a new retransmission consent agreement with the nation's second-largest cable provider. A short one-day extension had been made to 5 p.m. ET is allowing Spectrum viewers to watch New Year's Day event content on Tribune stations, averting a midnight deadline on December 31, but the stations are pulled at that point among an impasse between Tribune and Spectrum parent Charter Communications. The dispute is settled on January 11 in the early morning hours, on undisclosed terms.	
2	Four months after Julie Chen departs The Talk (in the wake of husband Les Moonves losing his chairmanship at the network), frequent fill-in and Dancing with the Stars judge Carrie Ann Inaba officially joins the host panel of CBS' daytime talk show.	
2	NBC Sports Chicago announces it has reached agreements with Wirtz Corporation and Jerry Reinsdorf to become the exclusive broadcaster for Blackhawks, Bulls and White Sox games beginning this year. The deal marks the departure of all three teams from WGN-TV, with the Cubs expected to follow, albeit through the creation of their own network.	
3	National Geographic Channel puts the current season of StarTalk on hiatus while the network investigates sexual harassment claims against host Neil deGrasse Tyson. On February 15, it was announced that Cosmos: Possible Worlds would be delayed from its original March premiere due to the ongoing investigation.	
6	NBC televises a late Sunday afternoon NFL Wild Card playoff for the first time (Fox instead broadcast the Seahawks/Cowboys game the previous evening), where the Philadelphia Eagles escape Soldier Field in Chicago with a 16–15 victory after a game-ending field goal miss by Bears kicker Cody Parkey. The game serves as a sizable lead-in to the Golden Globes, which starts on time. Parkey appeared on the network's Today five days later to talk about his miss, a move that rankled the Bears front office as well as local sportswriters and fans, resulting in his March 13 release from the team.	
6	The 76th Golden Globe Awards airs on NBC, hosted by Sandra Oh and Andy Samberg. It is the first telecast in an eight-year deal to keep the ceremony on the network. In addition, Oh became the first Asian performer to make history as a host and a winner for her role in Killing Eve. Green Book and Bohemian Rhapsody won as Musical or Comedy and drama respectively. The Kominsky Method and The Americans win top honors as best television comedy and drama. Afterwards, E! issued an apology to The Good Place star Jameela Jamil during their live red carpet telecast of the Golden Globes, in which they accidentally typed in Kamilah Al-Jamil instead of the actress' real name. Kamilah (played by Rebecca Hazlewood) is the sister of Jameela's character Tahani Al-Jamil, who that character is famously envious of for being one-upped, and Jamil later tweets that it 'is legit the funniest thing I have ever seen' and that it was 'a joyous mistake'.	
7	NBC affiliate WHEC-TV/Rochester, New York announces the firing of chief meteorologist Jeremy Kappell, three days after a weathercam network check-in of area cameras during a weather segment saw him appear to refer to the city's Martin Luther King Jr. Memorial Park with the racial epithet "coon" during a glance at the park's weathercam. Kappell asserts that he was speaking too fast and stumbled over his words, which he cited occurred with other media personalities in the past including ESPN's Mike Greenberg. However, Rochester mayor Lovely Warren, an African-American, called for Kappell's firing because it was "wrong, hurtful and infuriating." The station apologized for not stepping in to address the matter immediately. He has since campaigned online through petitions to apply public pressure to competing for CBS affiliate WROC-TV to accept him for an open meteorologist position as of early June 2019.	
7	NBC hosted a spin-off programme of a reality competition, America's Got Talent, entitled America's Got Talent: The Champions, pitting against the best of the franchise's talents worldwide. Terry Crews, who would later succeed Tyra Banks as the new host for the series beginning in the upcoming season premiering later May, hosted the spin-off. Canadian-American magician and winner of the last year's season Shin Lim was named the inaugural "World Champion" on the finale aired February 18.	
8	After nearly two years in office, President Donald Trump gave his first prime time address, to talk about the partial federal government shutdown, specifically its key issue, proposed funding for the Mexico–United States border wall. The networks also aired a response from Democratic leaders Nancy Pelosi and Chuck Schumer following the address, in which they explained their opposition to Trump's proposal to fund the border wall and to reopen the departments affected by the shutdown. The shutdown ended on January 25 with a short-term deal to re-open to the government that does not include funding for the border wall.	
10	Tribune Media's Fox affiliate KCPQ Tacoma-Seattle fires a news editor after reviewing video footage of President Donald Trump's presidential address on immigration that the station aired on its 10 p.m. newscast that appears to be altered, which showed a more orange-toned Trump with his tongue protruding after making a statement, making him more saturated and the tongue doctored. In a statement from news director Erica Hill (unrelated to the CNN anchor): "This does not meet our editorial standards, and we regret if it is seen as portraying the president in a negative light."	
10	Netflix announced that its upcoming series OBX would begin production in South Carolina instead of shooting in North Carolina due to the latter state's House Bill 2, otherwise known as "the bathroom bill," which requires transgender people use the public restrooms that correspond to the sex on their birth certificate. Although North Carolina repealed a section of the law in 2017, it didn't completely overturn it due to a clause that forbids municipalities from enacting nondiscrimination ordinances for any group not included in North Carolina state law until 2020.	
10	In an emotion-filled final broadcast, Mark Rosen bids farewell to WCCO-TV/Minneapolis, retiring after a nearly 50-year tenure as a sports reporter/anchor for the CBS O&O.	
11	Fox announces they do not intend to bid on the Fox Sports Networks that federal regulators have said The Walt Disney Company must divest after Disney completes its acquisition of many of the 21st Century Fox assets. The move paves the way for other companies to go after some or all of the 22 regional services.	
11	Megyn Kelly officially exits NBC News, receiving the full amount due in her $69 million contract and being free to join any other employer. The announcement comes four days after Al Roker, Dylan Dreyer, Craig Melvin and Sheinelle Jones were named permanent co-hosts of Today Third Hour, which replaced Kelly's Megyn Kelly Today following its October 2018 cancellation in the wake of Kelly's controversial blackface comments.	
13	The 24th Critics' Choice Awards are broadcast on The CW. Taye Diggs serves as emcee of the ceremonies, which combines accolades in both film and television, and is highlighted by ties in two categories, best film actress (Glenn Close for The Wife and Lady Gaga for A Star Is Born) and best actress in a TV film or limited series (Amy Adams for Sharp Objects and Patricia Arquette for Escape at Dannemora).	
14	Executive producers Alec Sulkin and Rich Appel, along with creator Seth MacFarlane, confirmed Family Guy would no longer write jokes against the LGBT community due to societal changes which have seen the jokes become frowned upon over time. The decision was confirmed in a fourth wall break in the January 13 episode entitled "Trump Guy" in which Peter Griffin (voiced by MacFarlane) tells President Trump that Family Guy would be trying to "phase out" gay jokes.	
16	Brittany Noble, a former news anchor at CBS affiliate WJTV/Jackson, Mississippi, files a complaint against the station and its owner Nexstar Media Group with the Equal Employment Opportunity Commission over workplace discrimination. Noble, who is African-American and a recent mother, cites racial harassment and issues involving management refusing to allow her to wear her hair naturally and her attire, along with improper accommodations which did not allow her to properly pump breast milk. She was dismissed without explanation from the station in May 2018 during time off she took after her grandfather's death, and was not told she was terminated until months later.	
16	Sinclair Broadcast Group launches Stirr, a free over-the-top content platform. The platform mostly carries Sinclair's owned-and-operated digital subchannel networks and customized feeds from their local broadcast stations.	
17	Bob Costas officially exits NBC Sports, ending tenure with the company that spanned over 38 years. Costas noted that his interest in the sports properties NBC held at the time had waned (he had retired from NFL coverage after the 2016 season), and that his favorite sport, baseball, was not among them, as it hadn't since 2000. He has indicated that he would like to continue on television, suggesting a talk show in the vein of his previous shows On the Record and Later. Costas continues his work for MLB Network.	
17	Former CBS Corporation CEO Les Moonves states he will challenge his firing and denial of his $120 million golden parachute payout from the network in arbitration and continues to deny the sexual harassment allegations which resulted in his firing the previous fall.	
17	Netflix offers an apology to Julie Morin, the mayor of Lac-Megantic, Quebec, Canada, over the use of the footage that was featured in the 2018 horror film Bird Box, which had used news footage of the community's 2013 rail disaster, which resulted in the destruction of the town's centre and the death of 47 people. Netflix licensed the footage of the disaster from the stock image vendor Pond 5, who then stated that the footage "was taken out of context," and wanted to "sincerely apologize." Pond 5 footage of the crash was also used in Netflix's Travelers (which was removed). Netflix then stated that they had no plans to remove the footage from Bird Box despite a further complaint by Quebec Culture Minister Nathalie Roy on the subject, but changed their minds on March 14 and agreed to remove the scene from future airings on the streaming service.	
17	General Motors temporally pulled their Chevrolet "Real People, Not Actors" ad campaign after Toyota, Honda, and Ford each challenged the series' claims as misleading. The complaints were brought to light by the consumer advocacy organization Consumer World, which claimed GM's data is made up from late-model vehicles (2014–2015) rather than new vehicle stock, some of which are models now out of production. The Ipsos survey was regarded by the other three manufacturers and Consumer World as outdated. Chevrolet resumed the campaign in July for its mid-size Blazer crossover SUV that was launched in January.	
18	Wendy Williams extends her hiatus from her eponymous daytime talk show dating back to the holidays due to medical complications from Graves' disease and a shoulder injury, her second such break within a year. The show would feature guest hosts from January 28 on, until Williams is declared medically fit to return; she would return March 4.	
18	Singer R. Kelly's longtime record label, RCA Records, officially drops him from their label, in the aftermath and fallout of Lifetime's docu-series Surviving R. Kelly which had already resulted in music retailers, artists, and radio stations pulling his music, refusing to put further promotional effort into its sale or addition to playlists, and stopping the sale of catalog collaborations and duets with Kelly.	
18	Puffer was launched, a Stanford University research study about using machine learning to improve video-streaming algorithms: the kind of algorithms used by services such as YouTube, Netflix, and Twitch. They are trying to figure out how to teach a computer to design new algorithms that reduce glitches and stalls in streaming video (especially over wireless networks and those with limited capacities, such as in rural areas), improve picture quality, and predict how the capacity of an Internet connection will change over time.	
21	After a five-year battle court battle over copyrighted material and fair use of newsgathering and sharing, Fox News Channel and TVEyes, a media monitoring service which mainly archives the video of television news services for permanent text transcription of closed captioning text, reached a settlement, in which TVEyes agreed to a permanent injunction and will no longer be permitted to carry copyrighted content from Fox News Channel and the broadcast Fox network's Fox News Sunday.	
21	Fox News Channel immediately issues an apology and blames a "technical error" for a graphic that ran during Fox & Friends earlier in the morning that reported the death of Supreme Court justice Ruth Bader Ginsburg, who was very much alive at the time of the incident and recently had surgery to treat cancerous nodules, of which she had since recovered. Steve Doocy told viewers "At the beginning of (Ainsley Earhardt's) interview with the process, a technical error in the control room triggered a graphic of Ruth Bader Ginsburg with a date on it... That was a mistake. That was an accident." Earhardt also apologized, calling it a "big mistake".	
22	With Tom Hanks as the sole guest and a surprise cameo by Milo Ventimiglia, TBS' Conan returns from a three-month hiatus with a retooled format that's a departure from host Conan O'Brien's previous late-night work: a shorter program length (from 60 to 30 minutes), which is less comedy-intensive, and without a house band or host's desk, and a more casual-style wardrobe. Longtime sidekick Andy Richter also returns.	
23	Viacom announces its intent to buy free Internet television provider Pluto TV for $340 million.	
27	Rent: Live airs on Fox to a mixed-to-negative critical reception, with the caveat that portions of the adaptation of the Tony-winning musical used pre-taped dress rehearsal footage mixed with a live presentation due to Brennin Hunt, who plays Roger, injuring his foot during the last-minute rehearsals. The prerecorded dress rehearsal was carried for the majority of the show, with only the final fifteen minutes of the program, which consisted of the end of the show and an encore performance of "Seasons of Love" featuring the original Broadway cast, broadcast live. The special posted a 1.4 rating among adults 18–49 and 3.42 million viewers, ranking the lowest among NBC and Fox's musical specials throughout the 2010s, though the adult content of Rent meant it could not meet ratings parity with the higher-rated family-friendly productions. The lack of understudies was also criticized by reviewers and social media, citing Hunt's accident.	
28	CNN's live Town Hall broadcast, which featured Democratic California Senator Kamala Harris, who on January 21, announced her campaign to run for the Democratic nomination for President of the United States in the 2020 United States presidential election and moderated by host Jake Tapper, drew 1.95 million viewers in the 10 o'clock hour, making it the largest for a single-candidate town hall in CNN history.	
29	Empire actor Jussie Smollett is said to be the victim of an attack by two unknown individuals in the Streeterville section of Chicago during the early morning hours. Chicago police say the suspects yelled racial and homophobic slurs at Smollett, who is African-American and gay, then punched him and poured a chemical substance on him. One of the attackers also put a rope around Smollett's neck. The incident was initially investigated as a hate crime. However, law enforcement suspected that Smollett paid the pair, later identified as brothers, to attack him. While Smollett has denied any wrongdoing, he was charged on February 20 with filing a false report, which in Illinois is a Class 4 felony. Police claim Smollett staged the attack because he was "dissatisfied with his salary." Smollett was indicted on 16 felony counts of disorderly conduct on March 8. Smollett was later cleared of all charges on March 26.	
31	Nexstar Media Group announces that three stations owned by Dreamcatcher Broadcasting (ABC affiliate WNEP-TV/Scranton–Wilkes-Barre and the combined duopoly of CBS affiliate WTKR and CW affiliate WGNT/Norfolk), which are operated by Tribune Media (which Nexstar is acquiring) under a shared services agreement, would be divested to comply with FCC regulations. Nexstar already owns NBC affiliate WAVY-TV and Fox affiliate WVBT in the Norfolk market and maintains a grandfathered SSA between Nexstar-owned NBC affiliate WBRE-TV and CBS affiliate WYOU (owned by Mission Broadcasting) in the Scranton–Wilkes-Barre market.	

=== February ===
Date	Event	Source
3	The New England Patriots defeat the Los Angeles Rams by a score of 13–3 in Super Bowl LIII from Mercedes-Benz Stadium in Atlanta, Georgia, in a game generally criticized for slow and dull gameplay. The game aired on CBS in English, and ESPN Deportes in Spanish (with said ESPN Deportes audio simulcast on CBS's SAP channel). The halftime show featured Maroon 5 with guests Travis Scott and Big Boi. The performance included a brief animated sequence featuring the cast of SpongeBob SquarePants, including Rodger Bumpass in his role as Squidward Tentacles, based on and including footage from the 2001 episode "Band Geeks". This was an intended tribute to the show's creator Stephen Hillenburg, who died in November from ALS. The sequence was a result of a petition that garnered over 1.1 million signatures. The ratings, however, were the lowest since Super Bowl XLIII in 2009, with a 44.9 rating, down 5 percent from the Super Bowl LII telecast in 2018.	
4	Just a year after it was announced as its next Broadway adaptation, NBC announced that it is canceling the scheduled May 27 performance of Hair Live! to fully focus on general audience broad-audience live musicals. This is the third time in recent years that NBC has postponed or scrapped a live production, as scheduling conflicts have resulted in Jennifer Lopez putting plans to bring Bye Bye Birdie Live! to television on hold, likewise with a planned adaptation of A Few Good Men Live.	
5	The Daily Show, The Late Show with Stephen Colbert, and Late Night with Seth Meyers all broadcast live episodes following President Donald Trump's State of the Union address. The Tonight Show Starring Jimmy Fallon shot his opening monologue and first guest segment, with Today co-anchor Savannah Guthrie live as well.	
6	The Simpsons was renewed for its thirty-first and thirty-second seasons, bringing the series to 713 episodes, making it the first American primetime scripted series to surpass 700 episodes.	
8	United Communications announces that the company will sell its three television stations – primary CBS/subchannel-only Fox affiliate KEYC-TV in Mankato, Minnesota, and the Watertown, New York duopoly of CBS affiliate WWNY-TV and Fox affiliate WNYF-CD (as well as the latter's repeater, WWNY-CD) – to Gray Television for $45 million. In advance of the purchase, Gray will assume control of the stations under a local marketing agreement to take effect on March 1. The sale marks the end of United Communications, Howard Brown's holding company for his print and television assets; Brown had died in 2011, and his heirs sold off the print assets beginning in 2016.	
10	The 61st Grammy Awards, hosted by Alicia Keys, air on CBS, once again from the Staples Center in Los Angeles after originating from New York City the previous year. Golden Hour by Kacey Musgraves (who won four Grammys) wins Album of the Year while "This is America" by Childish Gambino wins Song and Record of the Year.	
10	In an interview with ESPN's Outside the Lines, longtime NBC Sports anchor Bob Costas said he was dropped from the network's coverage of Super Bowl LII after remarks he made a few months earlier at a University of Maryland symposium that the sport of football "destroys people's brains." Costas was told by executives at NBC that the comments "crossed the line." Additionally, NBC forbade Costas from sharing an essay he had written regarding the 2015 film Concussion because it was in the process of bidding for the rights to the NFL's Thursday Night Football package at the time. Costas officially departed NBC after 40 years in January.	
11	Following an investigation into a growing amount of sexual harassment allegations which had already seen him removed from Rooster Teeth's online series RWBY and several upcoming anime convention appearances, dubbing company Funimation severs ties with voice actor Vic Mignogna, removing him from all current roles.	
11	Corday Productions files a breach of contract and fraud lawsuit against Sony Pictures Television – in the Los Angeles County Superior Court involving Days of Our Lives, for which Sony co-produces the series with Corday and NBC, along with handling international distribution. The suit seeks more than $20 million in restitution on allegations by Corday that include, among other claims, that SPT forced it to absorb budget deficits for producing the NBC soap opera, had declined to offer Days to certain foreign territories including the United Kingdom and France (even as Corday's share of distribution revenues decreased by over 50% in recent years) and failed to pay millions of dollars in profits, to "eliminate competition" with CBS's The Young and the Restless, a series Corday holds a 1% stake in, but is majority-owned by SPT and has maintained the #1 ratings position among American soaps for years. Representatives for Sony described the claims made in the suit – which was filed over a month after NBC renewed Days for a fifty-fifth season – as "meritless."	
11	During a rally for Donald Trump in El Paso, Texas, a supporter of the President's entered the section reserved for news media and attacked Ron Skeans, a photojournalist for the BBC. According to the broadcaster, "Skeans was violently pushed and shoved by a member of the crowd." However, he was not hurt and security removed the man. After calls from journalism advocates to condemn the incident, the White House asked for civility among future attendees of a Trump event.	
15	Apollo Global Management officially acquires Cox Media Group's 14 television stations, along with its entire Dayton cluster that consists of CBS affiliate WHIO-TV, radio sisters WHIO-AM& FM, WHKO, and WZLR/W266BG, and newspapers Springfield News-Sun and Dayton Daily News, the latter cluster retaining its legacy in the market due to Cox's origins that began in 1889 with the purchase of the Daily News by founder James M. Cox. The deal, estimated to be around $3 billion, will also include some joint venture agreements with Cox's radio, newspaper, and other media properties owned by the Atlanta-based company. This will be Apollo's second television group acquisition, as it has purchased Okemos, Michigan-based Northwest Broadcasting, which owns 21 stations in ten markets and plans to combine them with the Cox assets once the deal is approved by the FCC. The Cox family will continue to have a minority stake in the television properties.	
15	Federal authorities arrested United States Coast Guard Lt. Christopher Paul Hasson in Silver Spring, Maryland on gun and drug charges, as well as planning to use the weapons he was stockpiling to assassinate individuals associated with the Democratic Party, activists, and broadcast journalists that he felt had a bias or liberal agenda to support his white supremacy beliefs. Prosecutors noted that before his arrest Hasson kept a hit list that featured reporters and hosts from CNN and MSNBC on his computer and using research on his targets through the way of search engines over the course of two years, believing that killing them would inspire a race war and by advocating "biological attacks followed by an attack on food supply" in his manifestos. Among the intended targets, Hasson planned to kill on his list that he labeled as "Traitors" included Joe Scarborough, Chris Hayes, Don Lemon and Ari Melber.	
17	For the first time, the Match Game-Hollywood Squares Hour enters reruns as Buzzr, whose parent company Fremantle co-owns the show's archive with MGM Television, adds the show to its schedule. The series had never been seen on television since its first run was canceled in 1984 due to many reasons, including cross-ownership complications, the fact that the series archive has not yet been digitized or restored to 21st-century broadcast standards, and the alleged displeasure of co-host Gene Rayburn, who died in 1999, with the series.	
21	Actress, director, and producer Mindy Kaling signed a massive six-year, mid-eight-figure overall deal with Warner Bros. Television, ending a relationship she had with Universal Television since her tenure as a regular and writer on The Office in 2005. The news comes days after Universal signed Nahnatchka Khan to a rich four-year overall deal that saw the Fresh Off the Boat creator leave her longtime home at 20th Century Fox TV.	
24	The 91st Academy Awards aired on ABC with no host for the first time since the 1989 ceremony. Kevin Hart, who was scheduled to host this event, backed out due to his previous comments regarding the LGBTQ community who found them homophobic, of which he apologized amid the backlash against him. The event saw Netflix with 15 nominations, the most ever for a studio owned by a streaming service. Ten of those nominations were for Roma, resulting in three awards, including Best Director for Alfonso Cuarón. Green Book won three awards, including Best Picture, and Bohemian Rhapsody won four awards, the most for the ceremony, including Rami Malek for Academy Award for Best Actor. Black Panther also received three awards. All categories were broadcast, following the Academy reversing a decision to move the presentation of four categories, Best Cinematography, Best Live Action Short Film, Best Film Editing, and Best Makeup and Hairstyling, to commercial breaks. A similar attempt to shorten the show, by cutting down the number of Best Original Song nominee performances, was reversed on January 31. The event, which clocked in at 3 hours and 19 minutes, 35 minutes shorter than the 2018 telecast, did not feature any montages or comedic bits, posted a 21.6 rating/36 share in metered-market households, up about 14 percent over the 2018 broadcast, with 30 million viewers, even though it would be the second-smallest audience on record since the 2008 telecast, which had 32 million viewers tuning in.	
24	A news crew from San Francisco's KPIX-TV is robbed of their equipment, and their security guard is shot in the leg at the Oakland Public Library while covering a teachers' strike against the Oakland Unified School District in Oakland, California. Two suspects were arrested soon after.	
25	To celebrate its fifth anniversary, The Tonight Show Starring Jimmy Fallon pays homage to the format of The Larry Sanders Show, airing dramatic behind the scenes moments with guests Tina Fey, Robert Irwin, and the band Florida Georgia Line, and during cameos by Ben Stiller and Robert De Niro, who all secretly express animosity at Fallon (and vice versa) during the show's taping. The episode ended with a cameo from the show's executive producer, Lorne Michaels.	
25	Tribune Media's CW affiliate KDAF-TV/Dallas–Fort Worth forms a partnership with Urban One's Rhythmic Top 40 KBFB to launch a pop/lifestyle culture-centric morning show simulcast called The Beat on 33, hosted by the DJs from KBFB's Veda Loca in The Morning program (Veda Loca and co-hosts J-Cruz, Jazzi Black and DJ Kayotik).	
26	The D.C. Circuit Court of Appeals is allowing the approved 2018 merger between AT&T and Time Warner (now WarnerMedia) to stand after the court ruled that the Trump Administration's Justice Department had failed to prove that the transaction valued between $85 and $105 billion that would give the nation's largest telecom control over CNN, TBS and TNT amounted to enhanced leverage that would harm the marketplace, a decision that resulted in the merger to go forward. The administration, and notably President Donald Trump, had been against the merger since November 2017, noted by Trump's vocal distaste of CNN and his pledges on the campaign trail to not allow this type of media power consolidation, of which the media industry, in general, have pointed out that the move was immediately seen through a political perspective, with many suspecting undue interference. Circuit Judge Judith Rogers cited "The government's objections that the district court misunderstood and misapplied economic principles and clearly erred in rejecting the quantitative model are unpersuasive" as a reason for her ruling.	
27	In a 66-page ruling that was kept private until now, a $179 million award was handed down by arbitrator Peter Lichtman against 21st Century Fox over a 2015 dispute involving the 2005–2017 crime drama series Bones, in which executive producer Barry Josephson, stars David Boreanaz and Emily Deschanel, and Kathy Reichs (a forensic anthropologist who authored the Temperance Brennan novels that formed the basis for the series), filed lawsuits in California state court claiming they had been defrauded by Fox of their rightful profit participation. Lichtman concluded that president Peter Rice, Fox TV CEO Dana Walden, and Fox TV chairman Gary Newman "appear to have given false testimony in an attempt to conceal their wrongful acts." According to the ruling, Fox has taken a "cavalier attitude toward its wrongdoing" and exhibited a "company-wide culture and an accepted climate that enveloped an aversion for the truth" by lying, cheating and committing fraud at the expense of the show's stars and Josephson, who was told by Fox it was their most profitable series, taking in nearly half a billion dollars in its first seven seasons, while it hid the fact that Bones was calculated to be a money loser, which meant there would be no profit sharing (a practice known as Hollywood accounting). Fox later appeals the ruling, eventually leading to a settlement between the parties involved in September.	
27	Musician T-Pain, in costume as "Monster", beat fellow singers Gladys Knight (as "Bee") and Donny Osmond (as "Peacock") to win the first season of The Masked Singer.	
28	HBO CEO Richard Plepler, a 28-year veteran of the company, resigns. Turner Broadcasting System President David Levy, a 33-year veteran, did the same the next day. Both came after AT&T's buyout of Time Warner was approved by a federal court two days earlier.	

=== March ===
Date	Event	Source
4	Gray Television announced that it will acquire NBC affiliate WVIR-TV/Charlottesville, Virginia from Waterman Broadcasting. Concurrently, Gray will also keep Fox affiliate WAHU-CD (making it a sister station to WVIR-TV) and sell CBS affiliate WCAV and ABC affiliate WVAW-LD to the Lockwood Broadcast Group. Following the closure of the sale, Gray will not maintain any continuing relationship with WCAV/WVAW under any form of outsourcing agreements, joint retransmission negotiations or news production arrangements, nor will Gray and Lockwood will maintain any options or financial guarantees involving the duopoly or other television stations owned by the two groups. The sale, which was concluded on October 1, leaves NBC affiliate WBBH-TV and ABC-affiliated LMA partner WZVN-TV (owned by Montclair Communications) as Waterman's only remaining television properties.	
4	The Turner Broadcasting System begins dissolution as WarnerMedia reorganizes its assets. HBO, TBS, TNT and truTV will come under the jurisdiction of WarnerMedia Entertainment, led by former NBC and Showtime executive Robert Greenblatt. WarnerMedia News & Sports will oversee CNN, HLN, Turner Sports, Bleacher Report and AT&T SportsNet and be headed by CNN president Jeff Zucker. Cartoon Network, Adult Swim, Boomerang and Turner Classic Movies will be moved to the jurisdiction of Warner Bros.'s "Global Kids & Young Adults" business unit. Long-term plans are for the company to end the use of founder Ted Turner's name in the upcoming months.	
5	In the wake of HBO's airing of the controversial documentary Leaving Neverland, a fallout involving the criticism of the special occurs, concerning the credibility of the victims featured in the documentary, of whom were later interviewed by Oprah Winfrey in a follow up special After Neverland that aired March 4 and simulcast with OWN, and a $100 million lawsuit filed by Jackson's estate on February 21, claiming that the four-hour program violates a contractual non-disparagement clause to carry a 1992 concert from Bucharest as part of Jackson's HIStory World Tour. The documentary pulled in an average of about 1.11 million viewers overall for the two nights it aired, making it the third most-watched documentary in HBO's history. Two days later, 20th Century Fox Television, following a decision of the show's producers due to their concerns about the claims made in Leaving Neverland, pulls The Simpsons episode "Stark Raving Dad" – which featured Jackson (who was credited under the pseudonym John Jay Smith) as mental patient Leon Kompowski – from circulation in television reruns and most streaming platforms carrying the program's episode library.	
6	In a fiery interview with Gayle King on CBS This Morning, singer R. Kelly vehemently denies that he sexually abused women, allegations for which he faces criminal charges. King was commended on social media for remaining stoic while Kelly at one point got up out of his chair and began to scream and pound his chest. "It wouldn't have done any good if we both got hysterical," King told co-host Norah O'Donnell. Most of the 80-minute-long interview would subsequently be aired in full in a prime time special on March 8.	
6	The Democratic National Committee announces it will not allow Fox News to host any of its 2020 Democratic Party presidential debates and forums, saying the "network is not in a position to host a fair and neutral debate for our candidates". The move comes on the heels of a New Yorker article (featured in the magazine's March 11 issue) that detailed the close ties between Fox News and the Trump administration, which illustrated Fox News' scuttling of a story by now-former columnist/on-air contributor Diana Falzone about Trump's alleged affair with adult film star Stormy Daniels to protect Trump during his candidacy and the dual influence of Fox News pundits and Trump on their respective rhetoric and the administration's policies. The decision sparks a debate, with many liberals and progressives supporting the move citing concerns about potential bias creeping into Fox News' debate coverage due to the network's conservative slant and Republicans and some moderate Democrats contending the move would be counterproductive to the Democratic Party's efforts to defeat Trump in the 2020 election.	
6	Just one day after Jeopardy! completed airing its first All-Star Games event (won by the team of Brad Rutter, Larissa Kelly and Dave Madden) to commemorate its 35th anniversary, host Alex Trebek announces across the show's social media platforms that he has been diagnosed with stage 4 pancreatic cancer to announce the news on his own terms. Acknowledging that his long-term prognosis is extremely poor, Trebek says he intends on honoring his recently signed contract to host the series until the end of the 2021–22 season for as long as he is able.	
8	Showtime has announced that it is cancelling SMILF after its final airing March 31 and its distributor ABC Signature Studios suspended a two-year deal with series creator and star Frankie Shaw after lawmakers in Massachusetts — where the Boston-set series at least partially shoots — wrote a letter urging the show's tax incentives to be suspended pending the outcome of ABC Studios' investigation into the series. In addition, local legislators and activists called on the state's Attorney General Office to launch a separate and independent investigation into the matter. The fallout came to light after The Hollywood Reporter did a story in December 2018 involving allegations of abusive behavior and violations of industry rules that resulted in one performer leaving the series amid claims her contract was breached due to two mishandled sex scenes, and numerous employees contacting Disney's anonymous tip line about an array of issues and complaints that attracted the attention of major talent guilds, including allegations of separating writers by race. Shaw, who is being accused of these claims, is vehemently denying any wrongdoing made on the set of SMILF.	
8	The New York Yankees buy back a majority stake in their regional sports network, YES Network, from Fox Sports Regional Networks. The buyback is part of Fox Sports Regional Networks' divestiture in the wake of the proposed acquisition of 21st Century Fox by Disney; along with the Yankees, Sinclair Broadcast Group, Amazon and The Blackstone Group will be among the Yankees' minority partners in YES when the purchase closes in July.	
11	Fox News Channel issues an apology to its viewers, this time for comments made against U.S. Congresswoman Ilhan Omar (D–MN-5) by host Jeanine Pirro during her March 10 broadcast, in which Pirro attacked the Somali-American politician by saying that she is "Sharia-compliant" and has practiced "Sharia-adherence behavior" by wearing a hijab, and went further to add "Is her adherence to this Islamic doctrine indicative of her adherence to Sharia law, which is antithetical to the U.S. Constitution?" The remarks were also condemned by Hufsa Kamal, who also happens to serve as associate producer for Bret Baier's news show, reminding Pirro that "You have Muslims working at the same network you do, including myself. K thx." Fox issued a statement saying "We strongly condemn Jeanine Pirro's comments about Rep. Ilhan Omar... They do not reflect those of the network and we have addressed the matter with her directly." Omar also accepted Fox News' apology through a tweet: "Thank you... No one's commitment to our constitution should be questioned because of their faith or country of birth." Pirro, who has yet to make an apology, later stated that she would offer an invitation to have Omar on the show. On March 12, three advertisers, NerdWallet, Letgo, and Novo Nordisk, announced that they'll no longer air ads on Justice with Judge Jeanine due to her rhetoric opinions, which comes at the same time her colleague Tucker Carlson is also facing backlash over anti-Semitic, racial, and homophobic comments he made over the last decade on the Bubba the Love Sponge Show (which variously aired over broadcast radio and Sirius XM Satellite Radio) that were unearthed and placed online by Media Matters for America, which Carlson has defended and doubled down upon and the watchdog organization says they plan to keep monitoring their actions. Fox News cancelled the March 16 broadcast and five days later (on March 21) announced that a March 23 episode of Pirro's show will not air because of the controversy. Pirro's social accounts also go silent as reports confirmed that the host was placed on suspension until March 30. President Donald Trump posted a series of Twitter feeds supporting Pirro during her suspension.	
12	CBS Corporation announces it has acquired Lionsgate's 50% interest in Pop. CBS – which will operate the network as part of its CBS Cable Networks unit – acquired a 50% stake in the network (then known as the TV Guide Network, and in the process of phasing out the scrolling grid that it had been using since it launched as a program listings service in 1981) from Lionsgate for an investment of $100 million. The terms of the deal were not immediately disclosed by either company.	
13	CBS Sports announces it will trade the rights for Super Bowl LVI in 2022 to NBC in exchange for Super Bowl LV. The move is made to prevent a conflict between the National Football League championship and the 2022 Winter Olympics, which NBC holds the rights to and is scheduled to begin broadcasting two days prior. Furthermore, it allows CBS to position the game alongside its coverage of the NCAA Men's Final Four in 2021.	
14	The 2019 iHeartRadio Music Awards aired on Fox. This is the first ceremony to be broadcast by the network, having most recently been broadcast by WarnerMedia-owned networks TNT, TBS, and truTV.	
14	Matt Shepard, Kirk Gibson, and Jack Morris become Fox Sports Detroit's new full-time Detroit Tigers announcers. They are succeeding long-time announcers Mario Impemba and Rod Allen, whose contracts weren't renewed due to an alleged physical altercation after a game last season, which caused then-backup announcers Shepard and Gibson to take their places for its final weeks.	
14	Crown Media cuts ties with actress Lori Loughlin, who starred in the Hallmark Channel drama series When Calls the Heart and the Garage Sale Mystery film series for Hallmark Movies & Mysteries, following her indictment and arrest stemming from her involvement in a bribery scandal centering on college admissions that also snared fellow actress Felicity Huffman (whose husband, actor William H. Macy, was also named as an unindicted co-conspirator). Loughlin and her husband, fashion designer Mossimo Giannulli are accused of paying "bribes totaling $500,000 in exchange for having their two daughters [Olivia Jade and Bella Giannulli] designated as recruits to the USC crew team — although they did not participate in the crew — thereby facilitating their admission to USC," according to the 200-page indictment. Hallmark also decided to pull all episodes (including those that were scheduled to air) of When Calls the Heart, with the show's producers confirming on March 18 that her character, Abigail Stanton, would be written out, likewise with the Garage Sale Mystery films, including one that was about to begin production before her arrest. Netflix also fired Loughlin from her recurring role as her former Full House character Rebecca "Becky" Donaldson in Fuller House, on which she appeared in 13 episodes over four seasons.	
15	The Federal Communications Commission adopted new rules that were approved by the United States Congress in 2018, called the Reimbursement Expansion Act, which will go towards reimbursing FM stations as well as low-power and translator television stations that were "forced to incur costs to permanently relocate, temporarily or permanently modify their facilities, or purchase or modify auxiliary facilities" due to the ongoing television repack. The rules apply to all FM signals that were licensed and operating on April 13, 2017, that shared a tower with a repacked television station, of which will be eligible for reimbursement, estimated at $150 million, including costs for relocating, modifications of facilities or to build auxiliary facilities while a television station was rebuilding their facilities. A statutory deadline has been put in place to implement the rules, ending March 23.	
16	Raycom Sports, the long-time over-the-air syndicator of Atlantic Coast Conference football and men's basketball, airs its final game broadcast at the end of the 2019 ACC men's basketball tournament, in which the Duke Blue Devils defeated the Florida State Seminoles to claim the ACC tournament title. The package aired 1,664 ACC basketball games during the syndication package's 37-year-long run, including the company's joint-venture with Jefferson Pilot Sports (later Lincoln Financial Media), which had merged with Raycom in 2008.	
18	The 2019 NCAA Division I women's basketball tournament bracket, intended to be announced during a special program on ESPN at 7 p.m. EDT, is inadvertently revealed in full within side-screen on-screen graphics four hours earlier by sister network ESPNU, during a rerun of the Bracketology analysis program from ESPN the evening before. As a result, some schools cancelled public celebrations for teams expecting to be placed in the tourney and their fans or had to change those celebrations, along with some schools trying to keep the early news from their athletes to not ruin their celebrations. ESPN issued an apology for the error.	
19–20	The Walt Disney Company's purchase of 21st Century Fox consummates. This is the second spin-off of assets from the former News Corporation in five years; the company spun off its print assets in 2013. What is now Fox Corporation now only holds the Fox Broadcasting Company, its owned-and-operated station group, MyNetworkTV, and its news and national sports bureaus.	
20	Nexstar Media Group and Tribune Media announced that the former will sell 19 television stations to Tegna Inc. and the E. W. Scripps Company in separate deals worth $1.32 billion, in a move to reduce Nexstar's national ownership reach under the federally-imposed 39% cap and alleviate ownership conflicts with existing Nexstar properties. Tegna will acquire eleven stations (Tribune-operated WTIC–WCCT/Hartford, WPMT/Harrisburg, WNEP-TV/Scranton–Wilkes-Barre, WQAD-TV/Quad Cities and KFSM-TV/Fort Smith–Fayetteville and Nexstar-operated WATN–WLMT/Memphis, WOI–KCWI/Des Moines and WZDX/Huntsville) for $740 million and Scripps will purchase eight stations (Tribune-operated WPIX/New York City, WSFL-TV/Miami-Fort Lauderdale, KSTU/Salt Lake City, WTKR–WGNT/Norfolk, WXMI/Grand Rapids and WTVR-TV/Richmond, and Nexstar-owned KASW/Phoenix) for $580 million. Scripps gave Nexstar an option to buy back WPIX (which was likely divested as the station operates its digital signal on VHF, which, as the New York market accounts for 6.44% of U.S. television households, would put Nexstar over the national cap as it cannot be counted for 50% of its total reach under the "UHF discount") between March 31, 2020, and December 31, 2021. Due to the sale of WPIX, following the closure of the Nexstar–Tribune merger, KTLA/Los Angeles will become Nexstar's largest station by market size.	
23	The 2019 Kids' Choice Awards are aired with DJ Khaled serving as host.	
26	Univision Communications and Dish Network settle a major carriage dispute that began in June 2018, as well as all pending litigation between the two companies, immediately restoring Univision, UniMás, Univision Deportes Network, Galavisión, Tlnovelas and FOROtv to the Dish, DishLatino, and Sling lineup.	
30	The 50th NAACP Image Awards are aired on TV One.	
31	American children's programming block KidsClick ends broadcasting after only twenty months on the air.	

=== April ===
Date	Event	Source
1	Inside Edition host Deborah Norville announces that she would be undergoing surgery to remove a cancerous thyroid nodule. The cancer was detected after a viewer noticed a lump on Norville's neck.	
2	Publisher Little, Brown and Company released The Legends of Greemulax, the teen fantasy novel written by Ellie Kemper's titular character in Unbreakable Kimmy Schmidt. The book was actually written by Sarah Mlynowski. The release coincided with April being Child Abuse Prevention Month, as NBCUniversal is making a donation from the proceeds in support of Prevent Child Abuse America.	
2	Vin Di Bona Productions, the producers of America's Funniest Home Videos, placed Vice President of business development and strategy Philip Shafran on administrative leave in the wake of a March 19 lawsuit filed against the company by three unidentified women, who claimed that they were being racially and sexually harassed during their tenure in 2018, as well as their dismissal in October of that year, and, according to one of the women, discovered the following November that the company had moved her from salaried employee status to that of an hourly employee in July, all of which pointed to actions directed by Shafran. The women are hoping to seek a jury trial, which is pending in the Los Angeles County Superior Court.	
3	Marshall Broadcasting Group files a lawsuit against Nexstar Media Group in the New York Supreme Court, accusing it of sabotaging the value of Fox affiliates KPEJ/Odessa–Midland, KMSS-TV/Shreveport and KLJB/Davenport for future direct acquisition under a waiver of duopoly rules (which allow groups to seek approval for duopolies involving two of a given market's four highest-rated stations), being undermined in favor of Nexstar under the terms of Marshall's financing deal with that group (which Nexstar is alleged to have threatened to withdraw), being given an $16-million overevaluation of the collective worth of the stations, and withholding retransmission fees. (Before the 2014 deal with Nexstar, which was designed to appeal to FCC efforts to encourage broadcast ownership by minorities and address conflict-related divestitures through Nexstar's acquisitions of Communications Corporation of America and Grant Broadcasting, Marshall owner Pluria Marshall Jr. [who is African American] had struggled to obtain financing for station purchases – including a rebuffed 2008 offer to buy stations from eventual Nexstar acquiree Media General – dating to the late 1980s.) Nexstar issued a statement calling the allegations "spurious and without merit."	
4	News-Press & Gazette Company (NPG) announces its intent to acquire ABC affiliate KQTV/St. Joseph, Missouri from Heartland Media for $13.65 million. The deal would result in News-Press & Gazette maintaining a monopoly on broadcasting and print media in St. Joseph (where the company is headquartered) as it already owns the namesake St. Joseph News-Press newspaper, the NPG-founded trio of KCJO-LD (CBS), KNPG-LD (NBC) and KNPN-LD (Fox), and local news rebroadcast channel News-Press NOW. While it would be a quadropoly in structure, the purchase may not violate FCC broadcast ownership rules as KQTV is a full-power station while NPG's three existing stations are all low-powered. (FCC local ownership rules restrict a single broadcasting company from owning more than two of the four highest-rated television stations in the same market, but applies the rule exclusively to full-power stations due to their broader signal reach.) However, it could be subject to antitrust issues under DOJ review, due to the concentration of St. Joseph's print and broadcast media outlets under one entity in exceedance of its measure of market concentration constituting a tight oligopoly under the Herfindahl-Hirschman Index.	
5	Kathie Lee Gifford leaves Today with Kathie Lee and Hoda after 11 years to focus on other projects. Jenna Bush Hager will assume the co-host role of the hour thereafter.	
7	The 54th Academy of Country Music Awards are aired on CBS.	
8	Nexstar Media Group announces its intent to sell the Indianapolis duopoly of WISH-TV (The CW) and WNDY-TV (MyNetworkTV) to Circle City Broadcasting I Inc. (owned by DuJuan McCoy, who already owns CBS/Fox affiliate WEVV-TV/Evansville through his existing company Bayou City Broadcasting) for $42.5 million. The sale of the two stations – which Nexstar acquired as part of its 2016 acquisition of Media General – hinges on obtaining a waiver from FCC rules that prohibit common ownership of two of the four highest-rated stations within a media market to acquire the duopoly of WXIN (Fox) and WTTV and satellite WTTK (CBS) as part of its merger with Tribune Media.	
8	By this date, ATSC 3.0 test broadcasts had begun in Phoenix, Arizona; Dallas, Texas; and Lansing, Michigan. There had been plans to use Phoenix as the "test pad" for all-ATSC 3.0 broadcasting in 2018; since no consumer ATSC 3.0 receivers have yet been publicly released, these plans have been postponed indefinitely.	
9	Sara Gilbert announces she will step down as co-host and moderator of The Talk at the end of its ninth season. Gilbert – who has been part of the CBS talk show's panel since she created it in 2010 – cited difficulty balancing her day-to-day role on the show with her acting opportunities (including her role as Darlene Conner on the Roseanne spin-off The Conners, which ABC renewed for a second season two weeks prior) and her desire to produce other projects for her decision to leave the show, to lighten her workload so she can spend additional time with wife Linda Perry and their three children. Gilbert did not disclose whether she will retain her role as executive producer of the show.	
9	Professional gambler James Holzhauer establishes one of the most dominant runs in the history of the game show Jeopardy! with the game show's first-ever six-figure single-day winnings totals. Holzhauer won $110,914 during the April 9 episode, then surpassed that with a $131,127 win on April 17; combined with three other single-day totals over $80,000, Holzhauer now holds the top five single-day totals in Jeopardy! history, pushing the previous record of $77,000 (set by Roger Craig in 2010) to sixth place. By April 23, Holzhauer had become only the third millionaire in the show's history, following Ken Jennings and Brad Rutter. Holzhauer achieved his totals largely through aggressive but successful wagers on Daily Doubles and Final Jeopardy! clues. Holzhauer was narrowly defeated on June 3, concluding a victory streak of 33 games with an earning total of $2,464,216, and falling short of the current record set by Ken Jennings in 2004. Holzhauer would later return to compete in two tournaments, Tournament of Champions (held on November 4–15) and The Greatest of All Time (held January 7–14) and won $250,000 on each tournament (for the former in which he went on to win), putting him as the third-largest winner for an American game show contestant.	
11	PBS member station WGBY-TV Springfield–Holyoke, Massachusetts (a semi-satellite of Boston's WGBH-TV and licensed to parent organization, the WGBH Educational Foundation) and the six-station local network of New England Public Radio announce a merger between the two organizations, rebranding as New England Public Media. The newly formed organization will take advantage of the two entities' strength to provide better news and arts coverage of Western Massachusetts, with WGBHEF investing $6 million over six years in the new venture. All owners of the various stations involved (including the WGBHEF for WGBY, and Amherst College, American International College, UMass and the New England Public Radio Foundation for NEPR's stations) will retain control of their individual licenses and facilities.	
14	After nearly four decades of legal issues that prevented it from being offered in syndication except for DVD releases, MeTV began airing the first five seasons (1967–72) of The Carol Burnett Show in its original format, marking the first time since its CBS broadcasts that it has aired on any television broadcast entity. MeTV currently airs Carol Burnett and Friends, which has aired in syndication and cable since 1977, featuring packaged sketches from seasons six through eleven (1972 to 1978).	
18	The Weather Channel became the victim of an apparent malicious software attack on the network's infrastructure that temporarily suspended regular forecast programming that morning. The network's morning show, AMHQ (which was scheduled to start at 6:00 a.m. Eastern Time) was substituted with episodes of the Canadian reality-documentary program Heavy Rescue: 401, before the former program was able to start an abbreviated edition 99 minutes later at 7:39 a.m. ET. In a statement apologizing to viewers for the disruption, the network issued a statement disclosing that federal law enforcement was investigating the issue.	
18	Late Night with Seth Meyers aired a special 90-minute episode to allow extended coverage of the release of the Mueller Report.	
19	Journalist Natalie Morales announced that she will be retiring from Access and Access Live after three years.	
22	CBS Sports acquires rights to the Women's National Basketball Association beginning in the 2019 season. Under the multi-year agreement, whose terms were not disclosed, 40 games will air live on the CBS Sports Network in primetime and on weekends during the league's regular season. ESPN will continue to carry select regular-season games and the playoffs.	
25–27	ABC (via its ESPN on ABC division) joins sister networks ESPN, ESPN2, and NFL Network in airing the 2019 NFL draft for the first time live and in its entirety, as a secondary broadcast hosted by ESPN's College GameDay personnel over the course of three days focused on the stories and players of the draft rather than ESPN's traditional data and team-focused broadcast. Singer Taylor Swift uses ABC's coverage to promote the midnight launch of "Me!", the first single off her upcoming untitled seventh album.	

=== May ===
Date	Event	Source
1	Pluto TV introduces free versions of new parent company Viacom's cable networks Nickelodeon, the Nick Jr. Channel, BET, Comedy Central and MTV, at the same time reviving the Spike brand as a Pluto TV exclusive.	
1	The 2019 Billboard Music Awards aired on NBC for the second straight year with Kelly Clarkson returning as host. Drake was the night's biggest winner with 12 awards, while Cardi B, who led with a record-setting 21 nominations (a first for this event) took home five BBMAs. Mariah Carey received this year's Icon award.	
3	Sinclair Broadcast Group and Entertainment Studios (through their joint venture, Diamond Holdings) acquire Fox Sports Networks from The Walt Disney Company in a $10.6 billion deal made necessary by the U.S. Justice Department ordering Disney to sell FSN as part of its 2018 purchase of 21st Century Fox (due to antitrust concerns over its ownership of ESPN Inc.). The RSNs add to Sinclair's existing portfolio of sports properties, which include pending joint ventures for YES Network and the upcoming Marquee Sports Network; the Stadium digital network; and Ring of Honor wrestling. It's also the second major cable acquisition for ES, after its 2017 purchase of The Weather Channel. The deal would be completed on August 23, and would eventually lead to FSN being rebranded as Bally Sports (as part of a cross-partnership with the gaming company) in Spring 2021.	
5	CBS News announces anchor changes to its two flagship newscasts: Norah O'Donnell is named anchor of the CBS Evening News (succeeding Jeff Glor), and John Dickerson will become a correspondent for 60 Minutes (on which O'Donnell also serves as and will remain a correspondent). Succeeding them as co-anchors of CBS This Morning alongside original co-anchor Gayle King, effective May 20, will be existing co-anchor of its Saturday edition, Anthony Mason, and correspondent Tony Dokoupil. The news division also announces that the Evening News will move from its longtime home at the CBS Broadcast Center in New York City to the network's Washington, D.C. bureau in the fall, which would make it the second nightly network newscast to originate from the Washington metropolitan area, after PBS NewsHour.	
5	The 46th Daytime Emmy Awards are aired with Mario Lopez and Sheryl Underwood hosting.	
6	Tegna Inc. announces it will purchase the digital multicast assets of Cooper Media – Justice Network and Quest – for $77 million. The acquisition covers the 85% interest in the two networks that Tegna does not already own. The transaction was finalized the following month on June 18; Brian Weiss, president and general manager of Cooper Media, became a Tegna executive upon closure of the deal and will continue to handle the operations of Justice and Quest.	
6	Allen Media Broadcasting (owned by Byron Allen, founder/president/CEO of Entertainment Studios) announces its intent to purchase the Bayou City Broadcasting's four television stations – the Evansville, Indiana duopoly of CBS primary WEVV-TV and Fox affiliate WEEV-LD (which is simulcast on WEVV-DT2) and the Lafayette, Louisiana duopoly of KADN (Fox) and KLAF-LD (NBC) – from the latter group's owner, DuJuan McCoy, for $165 million. The purchase would mark Allen's entry into broadcast television ownership, and would likely provide financing for McCoy's pending purchase of WISH-TV and WNDY in Indianapolis (though his new company, Circle City Broadcasting) from Nexstar Media Group.	
6	WJZ-TV/Baltimore announces the termination of Mary Bubala after the anchor seemed to suggest during an interview with a Loyola University Maryland professor that African-American women were not fit to be the city's mayor. "Is this a signal that a different kind of leadership is needed to move Baltimore City forward," Bubala asked, referring to the resignation of two mayors, both black women. The CBS owned-and-operated station apologized via statement for the remarks made by Bubala, who had been employed by WJZ-TV for 25 years.	
7	During NBC Sports Chicago's live broadcast of the Cubs game with the Miami Marlins at Wrigley Field, a fan can be seen flashing an OK symbol behind Doug Glanville as the former player was delivering analysis. Believing that the gesture was intended to be racist (the Anti-Defamation League has noted it is used to declare white power), the Cubs said in a statement that the fan would not be allowed at Wrigley Field "indefinitely."	
8	Billy Bush is named the new host of the syndicated infotainment newsmagazine Extra, premiering on September 9 with its new base of Fox Television Stations carrying the program in major markets after moving from NBC's owned stations. The series will expand its focus from entertainment news to pop culture, sports and politics, airing from a new broadcast center and newsroom at The Burbank Studios (by coincidence, where Billy Bush's former program for NBCUniversal Television Distribution, Access Hollywood, originated until 2015), while continuing to report from bureaus in L.A. and New York and establishing new outposts in Nashville and Las Vegas. The program will continue in syndication via Warner Bros. Domestic Television Distribution. Bush, who is expected to succeed Mario Lopez (who himself was named the host of Access on July 17), is an Extra alumni, starting as their correspondent before joining Access. It is his first hosting gig since Access fired him in 2016 over the controversial tape in which Donald Trump made misogynistic remarks toward women in 2005. A further change of the show's title to Extra Extra is stopped a week before the season premiere, when an entertainment industry expo trade publication titled ExtraExtra Show Daily steps in to protect their 22-year-old trademark on the title.	
8	The Trump administration for the first time will require pharmaceutical companies to include the price of prescription drugs in television advertisements if the cost exceeds $35 per month beginning this Summer. The new rules, put in place by the Department of Health and Human Services, and for which has been controversial despite bipartisan support, will affect all direct-to-consumer television advertisements for drugs covered by Medicare or Medicaid, and must include the list price, also known as the wholesale acquisition price (updated every quarter), along with disclaimers that provide a list of potential side effects and an added message, "if you have insurance that covers drugs, your cost may be different." While the companies have agreed to the new rules, it could be challenged by the drug industry, which argues that revealing the list price will confuse consumers and could violate the companies' First Amendment rights, while the Pharmaceutical Research and Manufacturers of America, concerned that D-T-C television advertising featuring the costs could be confusing for patients, have already set up a website that would link patients to financial assistance for drugs as well as to company websites that provide data on list prices, typical out-of-pocket costs and sources of financial assistance.	
8	At 35 years, 198 days, Wheel of Fortune host Pat Sajak breaks former The Price Is Right host Bob Barker's record for hosting a single game show. Two days later on the 10th, the series celebrates the airing of its 7,000th primetime episode in syndication.	
9	Conan O'Brien settles a lawsuit filed by San Diego man Robert Alexander Kaseberg who claimed the late night host and his writers on Conan stole five jokes from his Twitter account in 2015. O'Brien also penned an essay in Variety explaining why the case was settled instead of going to trial.	
13	The 22nd season premiere of Arthur shows schoolteacher Nigel Ratburn marrying his male partner, Patrick. While not specifically referred to as gay, it marks the first time the children's animated series has addressed the character's sexuality, with a PBS Kids spokesperson indicating the importance of having a diverse representation in their programming. However, the episode was not shown by two state-run PBS member networks, Alabama Public Television (APT) and the Arkansas Educational Television Network (AETN), citing issues with whether the episode's subject matter was appropriate for young children. APT substituted it with a rerun, marking the second time that it pulled an episode of a PBS Kids program with an LGBTQ storyline (the state-owned network replaced a 2005 episode of spin-off Postcards from Buster titled "Sugartime!", in which Arthur character Buster Baxter visits a friend who has two mothers, with another); an AETN spokesman stated that it had screened the episode before deciding not to air it. Regardless of those over-the-air pre-emptions, it still aired without restriction on the website and app of PBS Kids.	
14	The Walt Disney Company and Comcast strike a deal, under which Disney will oversee operational control of the streaming video site Hulu effective immediately; a concurring "put/call" agreement would also allow either Comcast to require Disney to buy or, at fair market value, Disney to require Comcast to sell it the latter's 33% interest by January 2024. The deal establishes a minimum total valuation of Hulu at that time of $27.5 billion, which means Comcast could come away with more than $9 billion for its stake as long as it continues to invest in the service. The arrangement is expected to solve a series of minor conflicts between the two companies that saw them battling for a purchase of 20th Century Fox and related television assets (which Disney successfully won), as well as Comcast having agreed to help Disney buy out AT&T's stake in the service after the latter acquired WarnerMedia. Disney plans to incorporate Hulu into its expanding digital/streaming portfolio with Disney+ that is scheduled to begin in November.	
14	Freeform announces that it has acquired rerun rights to Rudolph the Red-Nosed Reindeer and Frosty the Snowman for its 25 Days of Christmas block. This marks the first time the specials, which had aired every year on CBS since 1972 and 1969 respectively, will air on a cable network. CBS will continue to share the rights and air the specials twice on broadcast television.	
16	Standard Media announces its intent to acquire ABC affiliates WLNE/Providence and KLKN/Lincoln, Nebraska from Citadel Communications for $83 million. Standard Media is indirectly related to the company (founded by investor and former Media General principal shareholder Soohyung Kim through his hedge fund Standard General) that attempted to acquire eleven stations that Sinclair Broadcast Group planned to spin off through its aborted acquisition of Tribune Media, although the company will be founded by Deb McDermott, who was tapped to run the original company. The sale will leave news-based independent WSNN-LD/Sarasota, Florida as Citadel's only remaining television property.	
19	With 13.6 million viewers, the series finale of Game of Thrones becomes the most watched episode of any HBO show.	
19	Laine Hardy is declared the winner of the 17th season of American Idol, becoming the third returning contestant to win after having been cut from the Top 50 in season 16, joining Candice Glover in season 12 and Caleb Johnson in season 13, as well as the first Asian-American to win the competition.	
19	Steve Kroft retires from 60 Minutes after 30 seasons.	
21	The Coca-Cola Company announces New Coke will be reintroduced for a limited time, in a campaign tied to the third season of Stranger Things, which takes place in 1985 when the controversial cola was released, but soon discontinued. 500,000 cans will be made available via vending machines in select cities and through mail orders.	
22	After months of speculation as to whether she'll end her show after 2020, Ellen DeGeneres confirms that she has signed a new deal with Warner Bros. Domestic Television Distribution to continue hosting her talk show until 2022. DeGeneres made the news official on her program, telling her audience "I'm excited to announce that I'll be doing my show for three more years," then joked that "Mostly because I love doing it so much every day, but also because that takes me to the end of my car lease."	
22	ABC airs Live in Front of a Studio Audience: Norman Lear's All in the Family and The Jeffersons, a live re-creation of the 1973 All in the Family episode "Henry's Farewell" and The Jeffersons pilot "A Friend in Need", originally aired in 1975. Produced by Norman Lear and Jimmy Kimmel, hosted by Kimmel, and starring Woody Harrelson as Archie Bunker, Marisa Tomei as Edith Bunker, Jamie Foxx as George Jefferson and Wanda Sykes as Louise Jefferson, the primetime special gives ABC its biggest Wednesday viewership since the Country Music Association Awards six months prior. ABC would rebroadcast the performance and subsequent Nightline interview with Lear on May 25. Two additional specials were ordered on August 5, with the first of them set to air on December 18.	
26	Speaking to Brian Stelter on CNN's Reliable Sources, Scott Pelley indicates he was removed from the anchor chair at the CBS Evening News in 2018 after sharing his concerns about a "hostile work environment" at CBS News with David Rhodes, then the president of the department. In turn, Rhodes allegedly warned Pelley he would be let go if he continued to press on the matter. Pelley then went to former CBS Corporation chairman Les Moonves before eventually being succeeded by Anthony Mason on the evening news. Rhodes denies that Pelley ever approached him regarding working conditions at CBS.	
27	Jamie Simpson, a meteorologist at Dayton's WKEF-TV (ABC) and WRGT (Fox/MyNetworkTV), calls out viewers on-air complaining on social media about continuous severe weather coverage preempting that evening's episode of The Bachelorette on WKEF during the Sinclair-run virtual duopoly's severe weather coverage. The conditions culminated in three tornadoes – two EF3s and one EF4, respectively – hitting the northwestern suburbs of Dayton, claiming at least one life, injuring dozens, and damaging and destroying close to 600 homes and businesses. Simpson later apologized for taking his frustration out on viewers. The live coverage, which has gone viral, also received support from Bachelorette star Hannah Brown, thanking fans for the loyalty but urging them to be safe, saying "Naders are no joke..."	
28	The FCC commences accepting applications for full-power, low-power and Class A television stations seeking to transmit over the ATSC 3.0 transmission standard. Stations currently maintaining channel sharing agreements are not currently able to apply to operate ATSC 3.0 signals, pending further revisions to FCC forms to accommodate those stations to file applications, but can operate 3.0 signals under a special temporary authority designation.	
31	Waypoint Media purchases the Independent News Network, cancels its national newscast, and rebrands its Little Rock, Arkansas operations as News Hub.	

=== June ===
Date	Event	Source
1	DirecTV drops 17 stations in 14 markets owned by companies associated with Sinclair Broadcast Group (including Deerfield Media, Howard Stirk Holdings and several others) after failing to reach a retransmission agreement. The stations were re-added on November 11, when a new agreement was reached.	
1	After four years serving as their analyst for the New York Mets broadcasts, SNY fires Nelson Figueroa after coming to work on May 31, in what The New York Post quoted sources as stating was "a state not fit to work." Figueroa, an alumnus of the Mets as a pitcher with the team and who is also employed by MLB Network, still wanted to appear on SNY's evening program, Baseball Night in New York, but was not allowed to appear. Figueroa's behavior became an issue with SNY, which resulted in being demoted this season from his previous post as a No. 1 studio analyst on the Mets pregame and postgame shows and was relegated to features on SNY's ancillary programs.	
5	Joe Crain – a weekday morning meteorologist and 15-year veteran at WICS/WICD (ABC) and WRSP/WCCU (Fox) – criticizes the "Code Red Alert Day" initiative by the Springfield/Champaign, Illinois virtual quadropoly's parent, Sinclair Broadcast Group, on-air, addressing viewer complaints that it is used overbroadly (even during low-end severe weather threats) that it unnecessarily alarms residents and harms local business revenue on the declared days. Crain was subsequently fired by Sinclair amid the critique, prompting an advertising boycott by several local businesses, an online petition urging the station to reinstate Crain and a complaint from Sen. Dick Durbin (D-IL) stating that the "Code Red" system "overstat[es] the danger to our community." WICS/WICD later stated it would rebrand its severe weather alerts to the Sinclair-required "Weather Warn" moniker.	
5	The 2019 CMT Music Awards are hosted by Little Big Town.	
7	Gray Television announces its stations in 93 markets will resume playing The Star-Spangled Banner at the start of the broadcast day, a tradition that has faded on most American broadcast stations as many have stopped signing-off nightly to maintain full 24-hour schedules; they thus become the first station group to return it en masse across a station group. Gray's film uses patriotic imagery over the voice of nine year-old Reina Özbay, a young singer from South Florida. The film was later syndicated to other station groups, beginning with the owned-and-operated stations of CBS in late August in the same year.	
7 –July 7	Fox Sports (in English, via FS1 and Fox) and Telemundo (in Spanish, via Telemundo and Universo, along with select simulcasts on NBCSN) respectively broadcast the 2019 FIFA Women's World Cup, with a mainly late morning and afternoon schedule of games due to the tournament being played in France (six hours ahead of American Eastern Daylight Time). This is the first major soccer tournament to feature a team representing the United States since the 2015 tournament, as the country's men's team did not qualify for the previous year's World Cup in Russia (which was the first such instance since 1986).	
9	The 73rd Tony Awards was broadcast on CBS with James Corden as the host. The telecast was watched by 5.4 million viewers, a 15% decline from the 2018 broadcast attributed partly to competition from Game 6 of the 2019 Stanley Cup Finals, along with the show being among the last nationally broadcast awards ceremony continuing to maintain a west coast tape delay (with some of Corden's segments having been uploaded to YouTube well before the show started there). Hadestown had the most wins among the nominated stage productions with eight awards (including Best Musical).	
11	Dispatch Broadcast Group announces its withdrawal from broadcasting with the announcement it will sell all of its television and radio assets (including CBS affiliate WBNS-TV/Columbus and NBC affiliate WTHR/Indianapolis) to Tegna for $535 million. The deal, which is expected to close later that year, will allow Tegna to expand its presence in Ohio (where Tegna already owns WKYC/Cleveland and controls the Toledo duopoly of WTOL and WUPW, the latter two of which were acquired as part of Gray's acquisition of Raycom Media in 2018) and Indiana (which would result in Tegna's re-entry into that state since their sale of ABC affiliate WPTA/Fort Wayne to the now-defunct Pulitzer Broadcasting 36 years prior). The deal was consummated on August 8.	
12	NBC's broadcast of Game 7 of the 2019 Stanley Cup Finals, in which the St. Louis Blues defeat the Boston Bruins to win their first ever Stanley Cup and the city's first championship win since 2011, was watched by 8.72 million viewers, the largest audience for an NHL game in nearly 50 years.	
13	More than 18.34 million viewers (a 13.2 household rating in metered markets) saw the Toronto Raptors defeat the Golden State Warriors to win their first ever NBA championship at Oracle Arena in Oakland, California, becoming the first Canadian NBA champion since the league's 1995 expansion into that country, the first non-U.S. team in any of the major professional sports leagues in the United States and Canada since 1993 (when the Toronto Blue Jays defeated the Philadelphia Phillies in a 4–2 game World Series run) to win a championship, and the first Big Four team to win a championship on their first attempt at the championship round since 2010 (when the New Orleans Saints defeated the Indianapolis Colts in a 31–17 game). The audience measures throughout the six games – which averaged 14.3 million viewers for the series, down 19% year to year over the Warriors' 2018 series against the Cleveland Cavaliers – were affected due to Toronto not being a Nielsen-rated market, even though the ratings for the NBA Finals across Canada (airing on Sportsnet, Citytv, TSN, CTV/CTV 2, and French-language RDS) has been setting ratings records for NBA games in that country. It was also the least-watched Finals since 2007, when the San Antonio Spurs' 4–0 series sweep over the Cavaliers averaged 9.3 million viewers.	
15	After a 14-year hiatus, Nickelodeon resumes broadcasting brand new episodes of the sketch comedy series All That.	
16	The 2019 Radio Disney Music Awards, renamed ARDYs: A Radio Disney Music Celebration, was broadcast on Disney Channel and DisneyNow with Sofia Carson as the host. It is the first telecast to be broadcast live on the platforms, after having aired on a delayed basis since Disney Channel began televising the event in 2014. BTS won the "Global Phenom Award", actress/singer Meg Donnelly won the "Next Big Thing NBT Award," and Avril Lavigne won the "Hero Award".	
19	Five anchors employed with NY1 – Roma Torre, Jeanine Ramirez, Amanda Farinacci, Vivian Lee and Kristen Shaughnessy, who range in age from 40 to 61 – file an age and gender discrimination lawsuit against the New York City-based regional news channel and its parent company, Charter Communications, in the U.S. District Court for the Southern District of New York, alleging that network executives hired by Charter following its 2016 purchase of former parent Time Warner Cable had reduced their airtime and anchoring duties in favor of younger female and male journalists, and had excluded them from promotional campaigns. The suit asks for an injunction for Charter to place the plaintiffs "in the positions they would have occupied" if not for "discriminatory and retaliatory treatment" and compensate them for "mental anguish, humiliation, embarrassment, stress and anxiety." In a statement, Charter spokesperson Maureen Huff said that the company is taking the allegations seriously as it "thorough[ly] review[s]" the issue, but has "not found any merit to them." Two former NY1 reporters, Thalia Perez and Michelle Greenstein, filed a separate lawsuit on July 31, alleging that they were each denied opportunities and ultimately fired in late 2017 because they were over 40 and were either pregnant or returning from maternity leave.	
19	The Weather Channel reaches a multi-year carriage agreement with Verizon FiOS, ending a three-year dispute over retransmission fees – the first such disagreement that resulted in a television provider removing TWC from their lineup – that began in March 2015 and resulted in it subsequently being supplanted by AccuWeather Network (which will continue to be carried by FiOS). The deal with Entertainment Studios (which bought the channel from a consortium of NBCUniversal, The Blackstone Group and Bain Capital in March 2018) will see TWC return to the FiOS lineup on June 24 and be made available on the FiOS TV mobile app in the fall.	
23	The 19th BET Awards are held at the Microsoft Theater on BET and its fellow Viacom networks.	
24	Gray Television announces plans to convert silent translator stations in two of the nation's smallest markets into NBC affiliates. In St. James, Minnesota, Gray plans to convert K07AAH-D, formerly a translator of CBS/Fox affiliate KEYC-TV, into KMNF-LD, returning NBC to the Mankato market for the first time since KEYC-TV switched to CBS in 1961. (Since no over-the-air CW affiliate exists in Mankato, KMNF-LD is also adding a LD2 subchannel affiliated with the network.) Meanwhile, in Fort Kent, Maine, plans are to convert WWPI-LD, which used to be a translator of CBS/Fox/CW+ affiliate WAGM-TV, giving the Presque Isle market its first full-time NBC affiliate (WAGM-TV itself had been a primary NBC affiliate from 1957 to 1959, but shared that affiliation with ABC and CBS; WAGM-TV would drop NBC entirely in 2005). The move will leave Harrisonburg (where WVIR-TV in Charlottesville, which Gray is in the process of buying from Waterman Broadcasting, operates a translator) and Alpena as the two remaining markets without a locally based NBC affiliate. While no specific dates have been announced, the two stations are anticipated to sign-on before the end of the year.	
26	Bob Ley, the last remaining on-air personality from the network's 1979 debut, retires from ESPN.	
26–27	The Tonight Show Starring Jimmy Fallon, Late Night with Seth Meyers, The Late Show with Stephen Colbert and The Daily Show with Trevor Noah all air live episodes to cover the first two 2020 Democratic Party presidential debates.	

=== July ===
Date	Event	Source
3	Netflix announced that effective immediately all new shows it commissions with TV Parental Guidelines ratings TV-14 or below, along with theatrical projects with an MPAA rating of PG-13 or will exclude smoking and e-cigarette use, except for "reasons of historical or factual accuracy," including new and future projects with higher ratings that will not depict smoking or e-cigarette use "unless it's essential to the creative vision of the artist or because it's character-defining (historically or culturally important)," and it will include labels and/or disclaimers on programs if the scenes/content featured smoking. The changes comes in the wake of a Truth Initiative report that came at the same time as Netflix's season 3 premiere of Stranger Things on July 4, in which Truth Initiative's analysis cited that its season 2 episodes had a 44% increase in smoking depictions from the freshman run, climbing from 182 in season 1 to 262 in season 2, and its season 1 had the highest incidence of tobacco depictions among the shows in Truth Initiative's inaugural study on the topic in 2018.	
4	DirecTV removes 120 stations in 97 markets owned by Nexstar Media Group as part of a carriage dispute that lasts until August 29.	
5	Univision Communications, owner of Univision and Univision Deportes Network, has contracted three investment banks, Morgan Stanley & Co. LLC, Moelis & Company LLC and LionTree LLC, to perform a strategic review of its assets and whether to sell the privately owned company. The news comes after Haim Saban, Madison Dearborn Partners and Providence Equity Partners were seeking at least a partial exit through a public stock offering or to sell the company completely. The three investors acquired the Hispanic-focused multimedia entity in 2006 and have explored offers to sell since 2014, although it did turn down a $15 billion bid by John Malone in 2017.	
5	A series of earthquakes that were located near Ridgecrest, California (which started on July 4, registered at 6.4; on this day it registered between 6.9 and 7.1 following a series of aftershocks) cause disruptions throughout Southern California, as far north as Sacramento, and Southern Nevada. The event is immediately caught live on air during a Los Angeles Dodgers-San Diego Padres game at Dodger Stadium in Los Angeles on SportsNet LA and ends an NBA Summer League game in Las Vegas that was broadcast on ESPN due to a fear of the scoreboard at the Thomas & Mack Center falling onto the court (a second game on NBA TV in a venue with wall-mounted scoreboards continues). It also disrupted Los Angeles independent KCAL-TV's 8:00 p.m. newscast, sending its anchors under their desk and causing equipment to dangle. The local stations in Southern California, Las Vegas, and west coast studios of cable news television networks interrupted programming for wall-to-wall coverage as news of serious reports of possible activity developed.	
5	Public Media Connect-owned PBS stations WCET/Cincinnati, WPTD/Dayton and WPTO/Oxford, Ohio are knocked off the air after a multiplexer in the master control power supply at WPTD/WPTO's downtown Dayton facility – which handles master control for all three stations – fails; the failure also affected its direct-to-fiber feed for cable and satellite providers. A new multiplexer (which selects input signals for output to the three stations and was not immediately available from their manufacturer) was installed by July 9, with programming resuming around 11:40 a.m. that morning, and forcing all three stations to reschedule more than a dozen PBS programs that were preempted by the outage for mid- and late-July. Cable and satellite subscribers in the Cincinnati region had to rely on WCVN-TV/Covington (a KET member station) for PBS programming during the outage.	
7	The 2019 FIFA Women's World Cup final, which saw the United States defeat the Netherlands in a 2–0 victory to retain its back-to-back championship title (and their fourth overall since the inaugural 1991 event, in which they won the first trophy), became the most-watched in Women's World Cup history in the U.S. with 25.4 million viewers on all platforms. The broadcast drew more than 13.98 million viewers and a 10.0 household rating during its airing on Fox, 1.6 million viewers on Telemundo, the most ever for a Women's World Cup match on a Spanish-language network, and an average minute audience of 289,000, bringing the total to 14.27 million. The broadcast also placed third among all-time Women's World Cup games, behind the 2015 final and the final match of 1999 (18 million), while the cross-platform audience outperformed the 2011 final's 13.5 million viewers, and ranked sixth among all-time for any U.S. national team World Cup match, men or women.	
10	The Federal Communications Commission substantially softens its requirements for educational children's programming (E/I), while backing off from the full repeal of the rules that the agency originally proposed the year before. Among the most prominent changes are that digital subchannel services will no longer be subject to the E/I requirements, and primary channels of television stations will only need to average three hours per week over the course of a year (156 hours per year) instead of at least three hours every week. Thirteen hours of programming per year can be offset onto the schedule of a digital subchannel, and an additional hour before the start of the school day (6:00 to 7:00 a.m. local time) will be opened up to count toward the E/I rules.	
10	The 2019 ESPY Awards are aired with Tracy Morgan hosting.	
15	After eight years, four of those as an all-night service similar to sister network Nick at Nite and with the move of much of its content to a new dedicated channel on Pluto TV, TeenNick's overnight classic program block (currently known as NickRewind) is reduced to a two-hour rotation of early 90s Nicktoons as TeenNick sees its first new programming in several years in primetime. The new schedule is made up of library MTV series such as Teen Wolf and former YouTube Originals from AwesomenessTV (a recent Viacom acquisition), which is branded as an "AwesomenessTV on TeenNick" block of programming. NickRewind would be restored to the full overnight block later in the year (it was moved to a five-hour block within days), albeit with a reduced program variety.	
16	Dish Network drops seventeen stations owned by Meredith Corporation, covering twelve markets.	
20	Following the expiration of an existing seven-year contract, AT&T removes 29 CBS owned-and-operated stations (including the company's CW, MyNetworkTV and independent stations) in 17 markets as well as the Smithsonian Channel and CBS Sports Network from DirecTV, DirecTV Now and AT&T U-verse amid a carriage dispute over retransmission fees as well as whether AT&T could sell CBS All Access as an optional streaming service, if CBS would be required to produce some programming in a higher 4K UHDTV format and if CBS content (including past episodes and complete seasons of series) would be available to all AT&T television subscribers. The blackout – which affected 6.5 million customers – ended after 20 days on August 8, after AT&T and CBS Corporation reached a new multi-year carriage agreement.	
21	Discovery Networks signs a deal with the surviving original members of The Brady Bunch — Barry Williams, Maureen McCormick, Christopher Knight, Eve Plumb, Mike Lookinland, and Susan Olsen — for a series of Brady-related programs that will air across the company's platforms ahead of HGTV's September debut of A Very Brady Renovation. The cast will also appear in a variety of Discovery portfolio series, with Brady-inspired episodes of Fast N' Loud, Chopped, Worst Cooks in America, The Kitchen, and The Pioneer Woman scheduled to air in August and a HGTV-Food partnership on a Christmas special planned for the end of 2019.	
23	Disney Channel announces the animated series The Curse of Molly McGee, which would later be known as The Ghost and Molly McGee.	
24	The Walt Disney Company has struck a settlement deal with Wind Dancer Production Group and writer-producers Matt Williams, Carmen Finestra, Tam O'Shanter and David McFadzean, to put an end to a lawsuit seeking $40 million in damages that was filed in 2013 over allegations that they had been cheated out of syndication profits from the 1991–1999 sitcom Home Improvement that resulted in a consequential appellate ruling and was within weeks of going to trial. The creative team alleged that Disney had charged massive distribution fees as well as selling the repeats of the series into the New York market (where it aired on Fox O&O WNYW) for no money, undercutting the pot of net profits, upon which they asserted a 75 percent stake. Since its syndication run in 1995, Disney has generated $1.5 billion from the show alone. The plaintiffs also claimed that Disney applied 35 and 40 percent distribution fees when licensing the domestic basic cable rights of the series and questioned the royalties they were getting from subscription video-on-demand services including Hulu (which Disney had acquired a major stake and full control of back in May). Disney however contended that it was authorized to do so under the contracts. As part of the settlement, both parties have not commented on the condition of the agreement or terms.	
26	Dish Network and Sling TV drop 21 of the Fox Sports Networks due to a carriage dispute. Because the sports networks were still in the process of being sold from The Walt Disney Company to Sinclair Broadcast Group when the blackout began, Disney management took a hands-off approach, having the Fox Sports Networks Group negotiate directly with Dish. The dispute continued after Sinclair took full control of the networks in August.	
29	PBS and PBS Kids enter a carriage agreement with YouTube TV, which will livestream select PBS member stations later in 2019.	
30–31	The Late Show with Stephen Colbert, Late Night with Seth Meyers, and The Daily Show with Trevor Noah air special live episodes to cover the second pair of Democratic presidential debates.	
31	The Walt Disney Company, CBS Corporation, NBCUniversal, and Fox Corporation – the respective parent companies of ABC, CBS, NBC and Fox – file a lawsuit in the United States District Court for the Southern District of New York against Locast, an over-the-top streaming service that retransmits signals of network-affiliated stations from select large and small markets. The four media companies are seeking a judgement to shut down Locast, claiming that its unpaid retransmissions of television signals violate their copyrights and threatens their retransmission fee agreements with pay television providers, accusing it of acting on behalf of Dish Network and AT&T (owner of DirecTV and DirecTV Now). (AT&T had made a $500,000 donation to Locast shortly after its founding, and founder David Goodfriend has served as a lobbyist for Dish.) Locast has held that its not-for-profit business model legally allows it to stream network programs without compensation.	
31	Warner Bros. Television announces it has "part[ed] ways" with Extra co-host A. J. Calloway – who had been under suspension by the show's production company since the investigation was announced on February 9 – amid a broad investigation of allegations of sexual misconduct levied by two women in January in a report for The Daily Beast. (Calloway had previously been arrested in 2006 amid accusations of sexual assault by author/activist Sil Lai Abrams; those charges were later dropped.)	

=== August ===
Date	Event	Source
1	At 1:00 p.m. Eastern Time (17:00 UTC), phase four of the FCC's "repack," a reorganization of the broadcast spectrum stemming from the broadcast incentive auction, took place. At that point, over 80 television stations throughout the United States simultaneously changed frequencies to free up spectrum claimed by telecommunications providers for use by next-generation broadband networks.	
1	Harry Friedman, the longtime executive producer of Wheel of Fortune and Jeopardy! since 1995 and 1997 respectively, announces that he will retire as executive producer of both shows at the end of the 2019–2020 television season when his contract expires on May 1, 2020 (his 25th year at Sony Pictures Television). In August 2021, it was revealed that the real origins of his retirement plants began back in April 2018 when he was hospitalized for 30 days for a series of three abdominal surgeries, which were life-threatening episodes, in which he made a full recovery. He was succeeded later in the month by The Price Is Right and Let's Make a Deal executive producer Mike Richards as the executive producer of both shows.	
4	Afton Williamson announces she will not return as training officer Talia Bishop in the ABC cop drama The Rookie, alleging bullying and racist comments made by hair department head Sallie Nicole Ciganovich throughout the production of the show's first season that she states had gone unaddressed to the show's human resources office after being reported to creator/executive producer Alexi Hawley, and incidents of sexual harassment and assault by actor Demetrius Grosse (who recurred as Det. Kevin Wolfe in five episodes that season) during its Season 1 wrap party. ABC Entertainment president Karey Burke said she learned of Williamson's allegations at the end of June, when Entertainment One – which co-produces the series with network sister company ABC Studios – opened an investigation into the matter. The network confirmed that Williamson will be replaced by a new character in the second season's fourth episode.	
5	Alf Clausen, the longtime composer of The Simpsons from 1990 to 2017, files a wrongful termination lawsuit against Fox, Gracie Films and 20th Century Fox parent The Walt Disney Company in the Los Angeles County Superior Court over his dismissal from the long-running Fox animated series. The suit, which alleges that he was discriminated against because of his age and a perceived (and unidentified) disability, claims that told that show producer Richard Sakai had informed Clausen that he was being replaced because the series was "taking the music in a different direction," with Hans Zimmer-backed music production company Bleeding Fingers Music assuming composing duties, noting that the company's operators "[were] substantially younger in age [and] was not only paid less, but was not disabled." After a portion was dismissed in August 2020, the suit would be dropped in January 2022.	
10	The 2019 Kids' Choice Sports are aired on Nickelodeon with Michael Strahan hosting.	
11	The 2019 Teen Choice Awards are aired on Fox with Lucy Hale and David Dobrik hosting.	
13	National Amusements reaches an agreement to re-merge CBS Corporation and Viacom – which were split into separate companies in 2005, five years after the then-Sumner Redstone-controlled company purchased CBS's assets – in an all-stock deal worth $28 billion. The deal, which is expected for completion by the end of 2019 with the entity being renamed ViacomCBS, will bring CBS and Showtime back under common ownership with the respective basic cable properties of Viacom Media Networks and BET Networks (including MTV, VH1, Nickelodeon, CMT, Comedy Central, Paramount Network and BET). However, the companies' respective production entities, CBS Television Studios and Paramount Television, will continue as separate operations for some time after the merger is completed. Current Viacom CEO Bob Bakish will head the re-merged company, while acting CBS CEO Joseph Ianniello will be tasked with managing CBS's brands. Meanwhile, Christina Spade, CFO at CBS, would assume the same role at the new company.	
19	The FCC reached a settlement deal with AMC, Discovery's Animal Planet, and ABC's Jimmy Kimmel Live over misuse of the Emergency Alert System tones. Together, the FCC is collecting over $600,000 from the offenders collectively in civil penalties, with all of them committing to a "strict" compliance regime as part of the consent decrees, according to the FCC's Enforcement Bureau. The fines that were handed out resulted from an October 3, 2018 Kimmel broadcast which simulated the WEA (Wireless Emergency Alert) tone three times during a sketch (ABC also paid fines for its O&Os and affiliates as compensation in the settlement), AMC's The Walking Dead airing the EAS tone twice in February 2019 on eight separate occasions, and Animal Planet for including an actual WEA warning in its Lone Star Law series when a crew following Hurricane Harvey caught a tone while filming that aired eight times.	
21	In a letter to the National Cable Television Cooperative, Sinclair Broadcast Group, owners of NBC affiliate WJAC-TV in Johnstown, Pennsylvania and operators of Fox affiliate WWCP-TV and ABC affiliate WATM-TV, announces that it is affiliating WJAC-TV's DT4 subchannel, currently affiliated with the Sinclair-owned TBD network, with The CW on September 16. This will give the Johnstown-Altoona-State College market its first full-time CW affiliate (WPCW in the Pittsburgh market, which was formerly licensed to Johnstown, has served the Johnstown market since the CW's 2006 launch).	
22	Former White House Press Secretary Sarah Sanders, who was controversial during her run with the Trump administration in the role, signs with Fox News Channel as a contributor to the network, along with Fox Business and Fox Nation.	
26	The 2019 MTV Video Music Awards was broadcast live on MTV and its sister networks, and for the first time it originated from New Jersey, taking place at Newark's Prudential Center. Comedian Sebastian Maniscalco served as the host.	

=== September ===
Date	Event	Source
2	Nexstar Media Group becomes the second station group in 2019 to return The Star-Spangled Banner en masse as a part of the start of the broadcast day on its current 171 stations in 100 markets, later expanding to Tribune Broadcasting stations after Nexstar completed its acquisition of that group on September 16. Rather than a standard anthem recording from a non-profit organization played on all stations, Nexstar will partner with BMI and Belmont University's Curb College of Entertainment and Music Business to feature a number of emerging singers and songwriters performing the anthem on a rotation.	
4	Just nearly six months after she was suspended by Fox News Channel over controversial comments regarding congresswoman Ilhan Omar, Jeanine Pirro, appearing on the show of former Trump administrator official and current radio personality Sebastian Gorka (apparently on an open mic during commercial time which was broadcast on a web feed of the program), revealed that the network barred her from competing conservative-oriented networks and platforms, and is unable to promote her newest book through those venues, including Bill O'Reilly's podcast, programs on Newsmax TV, and Eric Bolling's weekly Sinclair Broadcast Group show, America This Week. In addition to competing networks and ex-Fox News personalities, Pirro is not allowed to participate in any political campaign events under her contract with Fox News Channel.	
8	On the first Sunday of the NFL's 100th season, a power outage affecting a CBS Sports production truck stationed at TIAA Bank Field in Jacksonville, Florida for the Kansas City Chiefs-Jacksonville Jaguars regional broadcast forces the network to switch viewers, including those in Kansas City and Jacksonville, to other games. The initial explanation by NFL on CBS host James Brown was that the network was cutting away from the game for more competitive action (at the time of the outage the result was not in doubt, with the Chiefs leading 37–19 and eventually winning 40–26), but later revealed to be technical difficulties.	
12	The addition of comedian Shane Gillis to the 45th season cast of Saturday Night Live causes controversy when it was discovered he has made derogatory remarks about Chinese Americans, Muslims, women, and the LGBTQ community on the online comedy show Matt and Shane's Secret Podcast. A Lorne Michaels statement announces that Gillis was fired four days later, on September 16.	
16	Just three weeks after she was announced as a competitor for season 28 of Dancing with the Stars, Christie Brinkley withdrew from the event due to injuries to her wrist and arm in rehearsals, which would require surgery and made her unable to compete. Her daughter, model Sailor Brinkley Cook, takes her place.	
16	The FCC approves Nexstar's deal to acquire Tribune Media, which closes three days afterwards. Tegna Inc. took its share of stations including various Fox affiliates, one CBS affiliate (KFSM-TV/Fort Smith), and four ABC affiliates (WNEP-TV/Scranton, WATN-TV/Memphis, WQAD-TV/Quad Cities, and WOI-DT/Des Moines). E. W. Scripps acquired two CBS affiliates (WTVR-TV/Richmond and the duopoly of WTKR and CW affiliate WGNT/Norfolk) and two Fox affiliates (KSTU/Salt Lake City and WXMI/Grand Rapids) in addition to its share of its CW-affiliated stations. Graphics, mobile/web, and master control operations for the new Tegna and Scripps stations will remain under Nexstar's control until such time those stations are re-hubbed to their new ownership.	
16	During the finale of the eleventh installment of American Ninja Warrior, two contestants, Daniel Gil and Drew Drechsel became the second pair of contestants to reach the fourth and final stage of the Las Vegas-based national finals round – both scale a 75-foot (23 m) rope climb within the 30-second time limit; Drechsel successfully completed the stage at a time of 27.33 seconds while Gil timed-out during the challenge, making Drechsel only the third contestant to conquer the Mount Midoriyama obstacle, as well as the second contestant to win the $1 million grand prize, following Isaac Caldiero from the seventh installment in 2015.	
18	Blind singer Kodi Lee is announced as the winner of the fourteenth season of America's Got Talent, becoming the first person with autism to win the competition in the show's 14-year history.	
18	CBS Corporation, WarnerMedia and Viacom ban advertisements for electronic cigarettes, which have recently been linked to dozens of deaths and over 2,000 cases of a new severe form of respiratory disease. This comes after warnings of the health hazards of the products from the Centers for Disease Control and Prevention, the American Medical Association, and the American Lung Association. The top brand in the industry, the Altria-owned Juul, eventually announces the termination of all advertising for the brand, and its agency Omnicom DDB terminates their relationship with Juul shortly thereafter.	
22	The 71st Primetime Emmy Awards aired on Fox. For the fourth time in its history, the event was hostless, following the telecasts in 2003 (when the awards show also aired on Fox), 1998 on NBC, and 1975 on CBS. Game of Thrones's final season wins Outstanding Drama Series, while Amazon Prime Video series Fleabag wins Outstanding Comedy Series beating out front runners Veep and The Marvelous Mrs. Maisel. Series creator and star Phoebe Waller-Bridge also won Lead Actress in a Comedy Series and Outstanding Writing for a Comedy Series. Pose actor Billy Porter became the first openly gay black man to win Outstanding Lead Actor in a Drama Series. And for the first time in the history of the awards, programs originating from Great Britain won two of the three major awards (Fleabag for Outstanding Comedy Series, and Chernobyl for Outstanding Limited Series). However, the event pulled in a 5.7 household rating in metered markets, off by 23 percent from the 7.4 for the 2018 Emmys, which ended up with 10.21 million viewers, and easily the biggest decline among the major televised awards shows in 2019, with the caveat that the ceremony was against NBC Sunday Night Football. The audience could end up around 8 million viewers, which would be the first time since at least 1990 that they've gone under 10 million viewers, and would give Fox its lowest Emmy telecast since the 2015 airing, when the ceremony drew what was then an all-time low of 11.87 million viewers.	
23	The United States Court of Appeals for the Third Circuit, in a 2–1 ruling, has vacated the Federal Communications Commission's 2017 broadcast ownership rule changes that loosened cross-ownership and duopoly prohibitions, and remanded them to the commission for further consideration of how the changes affect ownership diversity. The decision was deemed a victory for grassroots media groups and organizations who challenged the changes, while at the same time criticized by FCC Chairman Ajit Pai, who along with Commissioner Mike O'Rielly and National Association of Broadcasters EVP of Communications Dennis Wharton, had supported the changes in an effort to allow media companies to consolidate television, radio, and newspapers entities in order to avoid financial difficulties and possible shutdowns or closures due to increasing competition from other platforms. The FCC plans to appeal the decision.	
23–27	The Tonight Show Starring Jimmy Fallon kicks off its seventh season with a full week of live episodes.	
26	Dish Network and Sling TV remove 29 Fox-owned TV stations in 17 markets, as well as Fox Sports 1, Fox Sports 2, Big Ten Network, Fox Soccer Plus, and Fox Deportes due to a carriage dispute. Fox News Channel and Fox Business Network are under a different carriage agreement and remain on that provider unaffected. Because of the dispute, NFL Network blacks-out its simulcast of the October 3 Thursday Night Football game nationwide, while NFL Network's contract with Dish prohibited the cable channel from airing different programming than what it televises on rival cable and satellite providers. The blackout ended on October 6 when a new deal was reached.	
29	Fox returns the Animation Domination programming block to its Sunday schedule five years after its first run ended, coinciding with the season premieres of returning comedies The Simpsons, Bob's Burgers and Family Guy, along with new comedy Bless the Harts.	
30	Ray Lewis, along with his partner Cheryl Burke, is the second season 28 contestant from Dancing with the Stars to withdraw due to a foot injury that the former Baltimore Ravens linebacker had sustained, which would require surgery stemming from suffering three torn tendons during a recent practice. Both had been in danger of being eliminated during the second week but survived (both Mary Wilson and Brandon Armstrong were eliminated instead during that previous week).	

=== October ===
Date	Event	Source
1	Entertainment Studios subsidiary Allen Media Broadcasting announces its intent to purchase eleven of USA Television's thirteen stations – ABC affiliates KDRV/Medford (as well as Klamath Falls satellite KDKF), KEZI/Eugene, and WAAY-TV/Huntsville; CBS affiliates KHSL-TV/Chico, KIMT/Mason City, WTHI-TV/Terre Haute and WLFI-TV/Lafayette, Indiana; NBC affiliate WTVA/Tupelo; and Fox affiliate WFFT-TV/Fort Wayne, Indiana as well as the rights to operating agreements for KNVN/Chico and Fox affiliate WLOV-TV/Tupelo – from USA Television for $290 million. Heartland Media will continue to operate as a management firm for the stations upon completion of the purchase. In addition, this would make Allen Media – which would own and/or operate 14 small-market stations nationwide – the largest minority-owned U.S. television station owner since Granite Broadcasting (which owned as many as 13 stations from the late 1990s until it began winding down operations the early 2010s). NBC affiliate WKTV/Utica, New York and ABC affiliate KQTV/St. Joseph, Missouri are expected to be retained by Heartland Media after the sale's completion.	
2	Just one day after the completion of its acquisition of NBC affiliate WVIR-TV in Charlottesville, Virginia from Waterman Broadcasting, Gray Television announces it is converting W30CT-D, a WVIR-TV translator located in nearby Harrisonburg (where Gray also owns ABC affiliate WHSV-TV and dual Fox/CBS affiliate WSVF-CD), into WSVW-LD, a separate NBC affiliate for the Harrisonburg market. (Since Harrisonburg has no over-the-air CW affiliate, WSVW-LD is also adding The CW Plus on its LD2 subchannel.) The new station, along with sister station KMNF-LD in Mankato, Minnesota, sign-ons December 1. With WWPI-LD in Presque Isle, Maine due to sign on in January, NBC will then have affiliates in every American market except for Alpena, Michigan (which currently has only one commercial station, WBKB-TV with the three other Big Three networks, along with a CW cable channel).	
3	CNN refuses to carry two political ads from the Trump campaign utilizing CNN and MSNBC footage (including Jim Acosta, Chris Cuomo, and Don Lemon, along with Rachel Maddow) and classing them as "media lapdogs" amid the Trump–Ukraine scandal. The President then criticizes the refusal and muses again about starting his own news channel, amid Fox News Channel dayside anchors challenging claims he has made.	
3	HBO Max signs a five-year programming and development agreement with Sesame Workshop, granting the premium rights to much of the company's archive, along with the first-run broadcast rights to Sesame Street while the HBO networks moves to the HBO Max content to replace HBO Go and HBO Now.	
8	Veteran television executives Bill Fielder (owner of Coastal Television LLC and former Gray Television chief financial officer) and Stephen Brissette (principal owner of Vision Alaska LLC) announce a joint venture to acquire three Wyoming television stations – Fox affiliates KLWY in Cheyenne and KFNB in Casper from the Wyomedia Corporation, and ABC affiliate KTWO-TV in Casper from Silverton Broadcasting Company, LLC – for an initially undisclosed price. The transaction will result in two Alaska-based ABC affiliates (KJUD/Juneau and KATN/Fairbanks) that are operated under time brokerage agreements with Coastal being transitioned to that group's ownership upon the Wyoming station purchases' completion.	
9	The 6 p.m. newscast for KTVU in Oakland features a headline about the Atlanta Braves being "scalped" when losing the deciding Game 5 of the National League Division Series to the St. Louis Cardinals, 13–1. Viewers took to social media to express their outrage at the Fox owned-and-operated station for using language considered to be insensitive to the Native American culture. KTVU issued a statement the following day regretting the incident.	
9	The 2019 BET Hip Hop Awards are aired with Lil Duval hosting.	
10	The Price Is Right celebrates the airing of its 9,000th daytime episode on CBS. Four days later on the 14th, as part of the Big Money week, Michael Stouber wins a total of $262,743 cash and prizes on the show, including $202,000 cash in the Pricing game Plinko, surpassing Christen Freeman's total of $213,876 (from October 28, 2016) as the largest daytime winner in the show's history, as well as the biggest known daytime winner in the history of American daytime television.	
11	Fox News anchor Shepard Smith leaves the network after 23 years. One of the last original members of the network since its 1996 launch, Smith was known for his neutral reporting on the conservative-leaning channel, often causing riffs among management, fellow anchors, and viewers.	
11	The Saddleridge Fire (a wildfire actively burning in Los Angeles County, California since October 10 and has spread rapidly after its ignition, burning over 7500 acres) has caused several studios to shut down production. Among the shows affected at this point are ABC's Bless This Mess, NBC's Perfect Harmony, Freeform's Good Trouble, the upcoming Party of Five reboot, S.W.A.T, L.A.'s Finest and Penny Dreadful: City of Angels. At the same time, Showtime's Homeland, which was supposed to film on the 118 freeway, selected an alternate location instead.	
13	Major media outlets, as well as celebrities, politicians, and organizations, are condemning a video depicting a macabre scene of a fake President Trump shooting, stabbing and brutally assaulting members of the news media and his political opponents that was shown at a three-day conference held by a pro-Trump group, American Priority, at Trump National Doral Resort in Miami between October 4 and 6. The video, which includes the logo for Trump's 2020 re-election campaign, comprises a series of internet memes that featured Trump's head superimposed on the body of a man opening fire inside the "Church of Fake News" on parishioners who have the faces of his critics (among them Rosie O'Donnell and Kathy Griffin), the logos of media organizations (like CNN, MSNBC, BBC News, PBS, CBS News, and ABC News), activists groups (among them Black Lives Matter), and rivals (like Hillary Clinton, Barack Obama, and John McCain) superimposed on their bodies, which had been edited from a scene of a church massacre from the 2014 film Kingsman: The Secret Service. A person who attended the conference took a video of the clip on his phone and had an intermediary send it to a reporter for The New York Times, which broke the story. While both the Trump Administration and Campaign quickly distanced itself from the video and were not aware of it nor had anything to do with the clip, CNN, Griffin, The White House Correspondents' Association, and Cindy McCain all condemned the video and called on President Trump to denounce it.	
18	The largest one-day frequency change takes place across the United States, as viewers rescanned their television channels as part of the national spectrum repack due to the discontinuation of RF channels 38 and up, allowing their UHF bandwidths to be sold to cellular companies. The move saw several markets (predominantly in the Midwest region, like Milwaukee, with eight of its eleven stations having made the changes) heavily impacted due to its proximity to nearby markets.	
20	During an outbreak of tornadoes in Dallas, NBC-owned-and-operated KXAS-TV remained with the Sunday Night Football contest in nearby Arlington between the Cowboys and Philadelphia Eagles, waiting six minutes after a warning had been issued for Dallas County before breaking into programming. Following criticism on social media, the station issued a statement apologizing for not reacting faster. "We...want you to know that we're doing everything in our power to make sure this does not happen again," it said.	
30	The 2019 World Series which saw the Washington Nationals defeated the Houston Astros to win first championship and ends the district's 95-year World Series struggle dating back to the Washington Senators winning the World Series in 1924. As the Toronto Raptors won the NBA Finals earlier in the year, this was the first time that multiple teams from major professional sports leagues in the United States and Canada won their first championship since 2001 (when the Baltimore Ravens defeat the New York Giants on 34–7 game to win their first Super Bowl title and the Arizona Diamondbacks defeat the New York Yankees in a 4–3 series to win their first World Series title) and the first time since 2012 where all #1 seeded teams from every Major North American professional sports league were defeated. For the first time in major North American sports history, the visiting team won all seven games of a best-of-seven postseason series.	
31	Telecommunications provider 3 Rivers Communications, which serves portions of north-central Montana (including Great Falls), discontinued its cable television service to its 1,800 customers within the state after only 10 years, citing difficulty competing with streaming services and satellite providers due to its lack of video on demand offerings. The company – which honored existing discounts and bundle pricing until the cessation of its television service – will continue to offer telephone and broadband internet services, as they have been providing for 65 years (telephone) and 20 years (internet) respectively, to 15,000 customers across Montana.	

=== November ===
Date	Event	Source
5	Fox Television Stations announces it will acquire the Seattle duopoly of Fox affiliate KCPQ and MyNetworkTV affiliate KZJO and Fox affiliate WITI/Milwaukee from Nexstar Media Group for approximately $350 million in cash. Nexstar, in turn, will purchase the Charlotte duopoly of Fox O&O WJZY-TV and MyNetworkTV O&O WMYT-TV from Fox for approximately $45 million. The acquisitions of KCPQ/KZJO (the former of which Fox had sought to buy since 2014, under previous owner Tribune Media) and WITI give Fox O&Os in two additional NFL markets with teams in the National Football Conference, which the Fox network is under contract to televise games (the Seattle Seahawks and the Green Bay Packers, of which Milwaukee is a secondary market), and would give Fox station properties in 14 of the top 15 media markets; it would also mark the return of WITI to the Fox fold, having previously been owned by the network from 1997 to 2007. In addition, the deal is seen as a move by Nexstar to clear space to allow it to exercise its purchase option for CW affiliate WPIX/New York City, which, as part of Nexstar's purchase of Tribune, was spun off to the E. W. Scripps Company to address ownership cap issues related to WPIX's uncompliance with the UHF discount.	
8	Vanna White is named the temporary host for Wheel of Fortune, marking the first time a woman has hosted the game show since its 1975 debut. White, who has been the co-host and letter turner since 1982, will fill in for Pat Sajak, who is recovering from surgery for a blocked intestine, and will miss two weeks of taping until December, when he is expected to return.	
10	The 45th People's Choice Awards was broadcast on E! in simulcast with NBCUniversal sister networks Bravo, Syfy, Universo and USA Network. Among the major honorees were Jennifer Aniston (who was honored with the Icon Award), Gwen Stefani (who received the Fashion Icon Award) and P!nk (who was honored with the People's Champion Award). Avengers: Endgame was named "The Movie of 2019". Television honorees included Stranger Things (for "The Show of 2019" and "Drama Show of 2019"), The Big Bang Theory (for "Comedy Show of 2019"), Keeping Up with the Kardashians (for "Reality Show of 2019"), America's Got Talent (for "Competition Show of 2019") and Shadowhunters (for "Sci-Fi/Fantasy Show of 2019").	
12	According to TVLine, in a budgetary decision by the company and amid ongoing negotiations between the network and show distributor Sony Pictures Television, Corday Productions – which handles the NBC soap opera's cast contracts – released the entire 27-member main cast of Days of Our Lives from their contracts as the show prepares to go on an indefinite production hiatus beginning at the end of November. (Due to the eight-month window between production and broadcast, NBC would continue to air first-run episodes of Days through the summer of 2020 under its current backlog.) A renewal would result in Corday potentially offering its main cast reduced salaries to reduce production costs in negotiations for new contracts, a scenario which opens the possibility that some of the actors may not return if they do agree to the offers. Despite the unique circumstances, the unprecedented move sparked speculation of Days' possible cancellation, leading some of the show's actors – including Kristian Alfonso (Hope Williams Brady/Gina Von Amberg), Chandler Massey (Will Horton), Camila Banus (Gabi Hernandez) and Freddie Smith (Sonny Kiriakis) – to assure fans and refute the cancellation rumors. The concern for the show's future has been surmised as expediting a renewal deal for a 56th season (lasting through September 2021), which was announced on November 21, with production expected to resume sometime between January and March 2020.	
13	The 53rd Country Music Association Awards aired on ABC with Carrie Underwood returning as the host with special guest hosts Reba McEntire and Dolly Parton. Among the notable winners were Lil Nas X & Billy Ray Cyrus (Musical Event Of The Year for the remix of "Old Town Road"), Luke Combs (his first ever Male Vocalist Of The Year prize, as well as the Song Of The Year for "Beautiful Crazy"), Kacey Musgraves (her first Female Vocalist Of The Year Award, as well as the Music Video for "Rainbow"), Garth Brooks (setting a record for Entertainer Of The Year wins with his seventh), Blake Shelton (winning the first CMA Single Of The Year award of his career for "God's Country") and Maren Morris (her first Album Of The Year award for Girl).	
18	Sony Pictures Television takes full ownership of Game Show Network, buying out AT&T's 42% stake in the network long held by DirecTV for $510 million.	
24	The 47th American Music Awards are broadcast on ABC with Ciara as the host. The award ceremony saw pop/country singer Taylor Swift bragged the most awards during the ceremony, including the Artist of the Year, the Music Video of the Year "You Need to Calm Down", and a one-off distinction as the Artist of the Decade.	
25	Standard Media announces that it would acquire nine television stations and fifteen radio stations from Waypoint Media and Vision Communications for $60 million. The television stations that are being acquired are dual Fox/NBC affiliate WGBC/Meridian, Mississippi, Fox affiliate WHPM-LD/Hattiesburg, Mississippi, NBC affiliate WNBJ-LD/Jackson, Tennessee, the combined duopolies of Fox affiliate WYDC-TV/MyNetworkTV affiliate WJKP-LD (in Elmira, New York), Fox affiliate KJNB-LD/CBS affiliate KJNE-LD (in Jonesboro, Arkansas), and dual Fox/NBC affiliate WPBI-LD/ABC affiliate WPBY-LD in Lafayette, Indiana. Waypoint's news production operations in Little Rock, Arkansas will also be acquired as part of the sale, which is expected to close in the first quarter of 2020.	
25	Hannah Brown is crowned the winner in the 28th season of Dancing with the Stars.	

=== December ===
Date	Event	Source
3	The cable provider in Braintree, Massachusetts, the Braintree Electric Light Department, stops carrying cable television signals through their wires after 19 years, due to increased retransmission consent and carriage agreements the provider was unable to shoulder, as well as problems competing with streaming services and traditional satellite providers. BELD will continue to offer full cable Internet access, while asking customers to contract with OTT television providers and over-the-air means for television reception with the provider offering Roku devices to customers.	
3	The tenth edition of CMA Country Christmas airs on ABC with Trisha Yearwood as the host.	
4	The 2019 merger of CBS Corporation and Viacom closes, reuniting the two companies as ViacomCBS after fourteen years as separate companies. Viacom CEO Robert Bakish will be President/CEO of the company, while Shari Redstone will serve as Non-Executive Chair of the board of directors.	
5	The Chevrolet Suburban, one of the oldest SUV models on the market, became the first vehicle to be awarded a star on the Hollywood Walk of Fame by the Hollywood Chamber of Commerce for its excellence in film and television, having appeared in more than 1,750 films and over 250 television series since 1952. The General Motors vehicle can also claim to have appeared in at least one television series every year since 1956, and at least one film every year since 1960, the most ever for an automobile of any type. The star, placed at the corner of Hollywood Boulevard and Highland Avenue, will also carry the Chevrolet "Bowtie" symbol instead of the entertainment symbols (film, stage, television, radio, and recording artist), another first for the Walk of Fame.	
8	Fox & Friends co-host Pete Hegseth confirms that he has been banned by Twitter for posting an anti-American manifesto that was written from Mohammed Alshamrani, the Saudi Arabian military cadet who shot and killed three people and injured 12 when he opened fire at Naval Air Station Pensacola on December 6. The assault was filmed by several fellow Saudi cadets, several of whom went missing in the aftermath. A few others have been detained by the US military. Hegseth took to Instagram to criticize the media, and especially Twitter, for not allowing him to speak out on what he sees as a person's opinions on "Islamic" rhetoric towards Americans.	
8	Host Steve Harvey has another lapse during his hosting duties for the Miss Universe 2019 broadcast, airing on Fox in the United States. The first moment came when Harvey introduced the winner of the national costume contest; after showing a photo of Miss Philippines Gazini Ganados in costume and declaring her the winner, he is immediately "corrected" on the photo by Miss Malaysia's Shweta Sekhon, who thought she was the actual winner, only to be proven wrong as Miss Universe confirmed Ganados did win the competition. The other moment came when he joked that "The cartel is still trippin' a little bit" over the flub involving the 2015 event when he mistakenly read out Miss Colombia as the winner that year, prompting the country's 2019 entrant Gabriela Tafur to remind him if he got the results right this time. Zozibini Tunzi of South Africa is named this year's winner, the country's third in the event's history.	
11	In CBS, contestant Dan Spilo became the first contestant to be removed and ejected from the 39th season of the long-running reality program Survivor, due to an off-camera incident that "did not involve a player", among which concerns on his inappropriate conduct were raised by female contestants, notably up until the eighth episode. The end of the episode confirmed his removal by Jeff Probst, and the season was panned with criticism following Spilo's misconduct. As a result of the removal, the live finale airing the week after marked the first time it was pre-recorded four hours before airing (and also the first season not to be held live since the inaugural season), while Spilo (along with two other contestants) were absent in the reunion show, and produced the lowest rated finale in Survivor.	
12	Luken Communications announces that it has rebranded as Reach High Media Group and that Joel Wertman has replaced founder Henry Luken as president and CEO.	
13	Sinclair Broadcast Group discontinued its daily commentary segment Bottom Line with Boris/CrossPoint, which had been airing over most of its 193 television stations nationwide since Boris Epshteyn, the former foreign affairs adviser to President Donald Trump's 2016 campaign, joined Sinclair in April 2017. (Epshteyn will remain with Sinclair in a corporate sales role.) The often pro-Trump commentaries—which replaced the Mark Hyman-hosted segment The Point, and were amended to include a liberal commentary by former Pretrial Justice Institute Director of State Policy Ameshia Cross in February—re-fueled criticism over the company's use of right-leaning commentaries that drew opposition from various media advocacy groups and Democratic lawmakers to Sinclair's aborted 2017 purchase of Tribune Media. An internal memo states that Sinclair will re-allocate its resources toward local investigative journalism at its news-producing stations, addressing longstanding internal criticism from some Sinclair station employees over the company's mandated allocation of newscast time to run the commentaries over locally produced stories.	
13	Just six days after a video that showed NBC affiliate WSAV-TV/Savannah reporter Alex Bozarjian getting slapped on the rear end during a live report on the Enmarket Savannah Bridge Run on December 7 goes viral and garnered national attention due to Bozarjian speaking out on having to deal with a culture on how women like her can be verbally and physically assaulted while on the job, Thomas Callaway, the person who admitted to doing this but said was caught up in the moment and now regretted what he done by apologizing to the management at the Nexstar Media Group-owned station for his actions, turned himself in to the Chatham County Sheriff's Office and was charged with sexual battery, and has been banned from participating in sanctioned running events. Bozarjian, who is being represented by Gloria Allred, and WSAV management, are confident that this incident will likely go to trial pending further investigation from authorities.	
13	Hallmark Channel pulls a series of advertisements for wedding planning website Zola featuring two brides kissing after receiving complaints by the conservative group One Million Moms. A Hallmark spokesperson says the ad violated network standards, though a similar ad with a heterosexual couple was not challenged. The decision prompted backlash from pro-LGBT advocates, who called for a boycott of the Hallmark company on Twitter. On December 15, Hallmark Channel reversed course and apologized to viewers. It also offered Zola a chance to reinstate the commercials, which they do after reluctantly saying they wouldn't advertise with them.	
17	YouTube TV begins offering live feeds of select PBS member stations.	
25	NFL Films allows two Western New York CBS affiliates owned by Nexstar Media Group, Buffalo's WIVB-TV and Rochester's WROC-TV, to rerun the 1991 AFC Championship Game as a Christmas special, in which the Buffalo Bills defeated the then-Los Angeles Raiders, 51–3. The telecast aired in its original standard definition format, though with NBC News updates regarding the Persian Gulf War and most references to NBC Sports outside natural game action edited out.	

== Awards ==
Category/Organization	77th Golden Globe Awards January 5, 2020	10th Critics' Choice Television Awards January 12, 2020	Producers Guild and Screen Actors Guild Awards January 18 – February 1, 2020	72nd Primetime Emmy Awards September 20, 2020
Best Drama Series	Succession			
Best Comedy Series	Fleabag			Schitt's Creek
Best Limited Series	Chernobyl	When They See Us	Chernobyl	Watchmen
Best Actor in a Drama Series	Brian Cox; Succession	Jeremy Strong; Succession	Peter Dinklage; Game of Thrones	Jeremy Strong; Succession
Best Actress in a Drama Series	Olivia Colman; The Crown	Regina King; Watchmen	Jennifer Aniston; The Morning Show	Zendaya; Euphoria
Best Supporting Actor in a Drama Series	—N/a	Billy Crudup; The Morning Show	—N/a	Billy Crudup; The Morning Show
Best Supporting Actress in a Drama Series	—N/a	Jean Smart; Watchmen	—N/a	Julia Garner; Ozark
Best Actor in a Comedy Series	Ramy Youssef; Ramy	Bill Hader; Barry	Tony Shalhoub; The Marvelous Mrs. Maisel	Eugene Levy; Schitt's Creek
Best Actress in a Comedy Series	Phoebe Waller-Bridge; Fleabag			Catherine O'Hara; Schitt's Creek
Best Supporting Actor in a Comedy Series	—N/a	Andrew Scott; Fleabag	—N/a	Dan Levy; Schitt's Creek
Best Supporting Actress in a Comedy Series	—N/a	Alex Borstein; The Marvelous Mrs. Maisel	—N/a	Annie Murphy; Schitt's Creek
Best Actor in a Limited Series	Russell Crowe; The Loudest Voice	Jharrel Jerome; When They See Us	Sam Rockwell; Fosse/Verdon	Mark Ruffalo; I Know This Much Is True
Best Actress in a Limited Series	Michelle Williams; Fosse/Verdon			Regina King; Watchmen
Best Supporting Actor in a Limited Series	Stellan Skarsgård; Chernobyl		—N/a	Yahya Abdul-Mateen II; Watchmen
Best Supporting Actress in a Limited Series	Patricia Arquette; The Act	Toni Collette; Unbelievable	—N/a	Uzo Aduba; Mrs. America

== Television shows ==
=== Shows changing networks ===
Show	Moved from	Moved to	Source
Milo Murphy's Law	Disney XD	Disney Channel/Disney XD	
Star vs. the Forces of Evil	Disney XD	Disney Channel/Disney XD	
Indianapolis 500	ABC	NBC	
Brooklyn Nine-Nine	Fox	NBC	
Lucifer	Fox	Netflix	
Designated Survivor	ABC	Netflix	
Impact!	Pop	Pursuit Channel/Twitch	
Impact!	Pursuit Channel/Twitch	AXS TV	
Drop the Mic	TBS	TNT/TBS	
The Joker's Wild	TBS	TNT/TBS	
Final Space	TBS	Adult Swim/TBS	
iHeartRadio Music Awards	TBS/TNT/TruTV	Fox	
WWE SmackDown	USA Network	Fox	
Project Runway	Lifetime	Bravo	
You	Lifetime	Netflix	
Hunter Street	Nickelodeon	TeenNick	
Rise of the Teenage Mutant Ninja Turtles	Nickelodeon	Nicktoons	
Stellar Awards	TV One	BET	
The Expanse	Syfy	Amazon Video	
Inside the Actors Studio	Bravo	Ovation	
Sunnyside	NBC	NBC.com	
Running Wild with Bear Grylls	NBC	National Geographic	
Killing Eve	BBC America	BBC America/AMC	
Savage Builds	Discovery Channel	Discovery Channel/Science Channel	
Masters of Disaster	Discovery Channel	Science Channel	
Jeremy Wade's Dark Waters	Animal Planet	Discovery Channel	
Nick Cannon Presents: Wild 'N Out	MTV	VH1	
Man v. Food	Travel Channel	Cooking Channel	
WWE NXT	WWE Network	WWE Network/USA Network	
Always Late with Katie Nolan	ESPN+	ESPN2	
Cake Boss	TLC	Discovery Family	

=== Milestone episodes and anniversaries ===
Show	Network	Episode #	Episode title	Episode airdate	Source
The Bold and the Beautiful	CBS	8,000th	"#8000"	January 4	
The Simpsons	Fox	650th	"Mad About the Toy"	January 6	
The Tonight Show Starring Jimmy Fallon	NBC	1,000th	"Molly Shannon/Zachary Quinto/Robert Irwin"	January 23	
Arrow	The CW	150th	"Emerald Archer"	February 4	
Chicago Fire	NBC	150th	"The Plunge"	February 6	
Supernatural	The CW	300th	"Lebanon"	February 7	
Law & Order: Special Victims Unit	NBC	450th	"Facing Demons"	February 21	
American Dad!	TBS	250th	"Persona Assistant"	February 25	
Henry Danger	Nickelodeon	100th	"Secret Room"	March 2	
Fresh Off the Boat	ABC	100th	"Under the Taipei Sun"	April 5	
Last Man Standing	Fox	150th	"Yass Queen"	April 19	
Live PD	A&E	200th	"04.19.19"	April 19	
Gotham	Fox	100th	"The Beginning" (series finale)	April 25	
My Little Pony: Friendship Is Magic	Discovery Family	200th	"The Point of No Return"	April 27	
Ben 10	Cartoon Network	100th	"Four by Four"	April 27	
Busy Tonight	E!	100th	"Josh Hopkins & Kevin Morby"	May 5	
Wheel of Fortune	Syndication	7,000th	"Wheel 7000"	May 10	
Last Call with Carson Daly	NBC	2,000th	"Last Call 2,000" (series finale)	May 25	
Real Time with Bill Maher	HBO	500th	"Real Time with Bill Maher 500"	June 21	
Watch What Happens Live with Andy Cohen	Bravo	10th anniversary	10 Year Anniversary Show: Chrissy Teigen And Countess Performance	June 27	
SpongeBob SquarePants	Nickelodeon	250th	"Broken Alarm"	July 6	
SpongeBob SquarePants	Nickelodeon	250th	"Karen's Baby"	August 10	
SpongeBob SquarePants	Nickelodeon	20th anniversary	"SpongeBob's Big Birthday Blowout"	July 12	
Teen Titans Go!	Cartoon Network	250th	"Strength of a Grown Man"	July 10	
Elementary	CBS	150th	"On the Scent"	July 18	
Jane the Virgin	The CW	100th	"Chapter One Hundred" (series finale)	July 31	
The Late Show with Stephen Colbert	CBS	800th	"Hispan-dering"	September 17	
Blue Bloods	CBS	200th	"The Real Deal"	September 27	
South Park	Comedy Central	300th	"Shots!!!"	October 9	
The Price Is Right	CBS	9,000th	"9000th"	October 10	
American Horror Story	FX	100th	"Episode 100"	October 23	
It's Always Sunny in Philadelphia	FXX	150th	"The Janitor Always Mops Twice"	October 30	
The Loud House	Nickelodeon	150th	"Love Birds/Rocket Men"	November 2	
The View	ABC	5,000th	N/A	November 7	
Sesame Street	HBO/PBS	50th anniversary	"Sesame Street's 50th Anniversary Celebration"	November 9 (HBO)	
Sesame Street	HBO/PBS	50th anniversary	"Sesame Street's 50th Anniversary Celebration"	November 17 (PBS)	
Grey's Anatomy	ABC	350th	"My Shot"	November 14	
Paw Patrol	Nick Jr.	150th	"Pups Save the Squirrels/Pups Save a Roo"	November 14	
NCIS: Los Angeles	CBS	250th	"Mother"	December 1	
America's Funniest Home Videos	ABC	30th anniversary	"AFV: America, This Is You!"	December 8	
The Goldbergs	ABC	150th	"It's a Wonderful Life"	December 11	

=== Shows returning in 2019 ===
The following shows will return with new episodes after being canceled or ended their run previously:

Show	Last aired	Type of Return	Previous channel	New/returning/same channel	Return date	Source
Young Justice (as Young Justice: Outsiders)	2013	New season	Cartoon Network	DC Universe	January 4	
Brooklyn Nine-Nine	2018	New season	Fox	NBC	January 10	
True Detective	2015	New season	HBO	same	January 13	
Temptation Island	2003	Revival	Fox	USA Network	January 15	
Desus & Mero	2018	Revival	Viceland	Showtime	February 21	
Project Runway	2017	New season	Lifetime	Bravo	March 14	
The Twilight Zone	2003	Revival	UPN	CBS All Access	April 1	
30 Minute Meals	2012	Revival	Food Network	same	April 1	
Wife Swap	2015	Revival	ABC	Paramount Network	April 4	
A Double Shot at Love (as Double Shot at Love With DJ Pauly D and Vinny)	2009	Revival	MTV	same	April 11	
Lucifer	2018	New season	Fox	Netflix	May 8	
Paradise Hotel	2008	Revival	MyNetworkTV	Fox	May 9	
Harvey Street Kids (as Harvey Girls Forever!)	2018	New season	Netflix	same	May 10	
Executed with Deborah Norville	2017	Revival	Reelz	same	May 21	
America Unearthed	2015	Revival	H2	Travel Channel	May 28	
Designated Survivor	2018	New season	ABC	Netflix	June 7	
Ripley's Believe It or Not!	2003	Revival	TBS	Travel Channel	June 9	
Are You Smarter than a 5th Grader?	2015	Revival	Fox	Nickelodeon	June 10	
Card Sharks	2002	Revival	First-run syndication	ABC	June 12	
Press Your Luck	2003	Revival	Game Show Network	ABC	June 12	
The Real World (as The Real World: Atlanta)	2017	Revival	MTV	Facebook Watch	June 13	
All That	2005	Revival	Nickelodeon	same	June 15	
The Hills (as The Hills: New Beginnings)	2010	Revival	MTV	same	June 24	
Sunday Best	2015	Revival	BET	same	June 30	
Man v. Food	2018	New season	Travel Channel	Cooking Channel	July 2	
Scream	2016	New season	MTV	VH1	July 8	
Veronica Mars	2007	Revival	The CW	Hulu	July 19	
Worst Bakers in America	2016	Revival	Food Network	same	July 22	
Traveling the Stars: Action Bronson and Friends Watch Ancient Aliens	2016	Revival	Viceland	same	August 5	
The Daily Line	2010	Revival	Versus	NBC Sports Regional Networks	August 5	
Psychic Kids	2010	Revival	A&E	same	August 21	
Mountain Monsters	2017	New season	Destination America	Travel Channel	August 21	
Ghost Hunters	2016	Revival	Syfy	A&E	August 21	
Good Eats	2012	Revival	Cooking Channel	Food Network	August 25	
Deadline: Crime With Tamron Hall	2017	Revival	Investigation Discovery	same	September 8	
NFL Primetime	2005	Revival	ESPN	ESPN+	September 15	
Crank Yankers	2007	Revival	MTV2	Comedy Central	September 25	
Bubble Guppies	2016	Revival	Nickelodeon/Nick Jr.	same	September 27	
Kids Say the Darndest Things	2000	Revival	CBS	ABC	October 6	
E! True Hollywood Story	2012	Revival	E!	same	October 6	
Cash Cab	2018	Revival	Discovery Channel	Bravo	October 7	
Are You Afraid of the Dark?	2000	Revival	Nickelodeon	same	October 11	
Inside the Actors Studio	2018	New season	Bravo	Ovation	October 13	
Catch 21	2011	Revival	Game Show Network	same	October 14	
Ghostwriter	1995	Reboot	PBS	Apple TV+	November 1	
Running Wild with Bear Grylls	2018	New season	NBC	National Geographic	November 5	
Blue's Clues (as Blue's Clues & You!)	2006	Revival	Nickelodeon/Nick Jr. Channel	same	November 11	
Overhaulin'	2015	Revival	Velocity	Motor Trend	November 16	
Blind Date	2006	Reboot	First-run syndication	Bravo	November 18	
Mad About You	1999	Revival	NBC	Spectrum Originals	November 20	
Clifford the Big Red Dog	2003	Reboot	PBS Kids	PBS Kids/Amazon Prime Video	December 7	
Aerial America	2017	Revival	Smithsonian Channel	same	December 8	
The Expanse	2018	New season	Syfy	Amazon Prime Video	December 13	
Food Network Challenge	2011	Reboot	Food Network	same	December 23	
Brain Games	2016	Revival	National Geographic	same	December 29	

=== Shows ending in 2019 ===
End date	Show	Channel	First aired	Status	Source
January 1	A Series of Unfortunate Events	Netflix	2017	Ended	
January 11	Friends from College	Netflix	2017	Cancelled	
January 13	Rel	Fox	2018	Cancelled	
January 14	Happy Together	CBS	2018	Cancelled	
January 16	Wayne	YouTube Premium	2019	Cancelled	
January 18	The Punisher	Netflix	2017	Cancelled	
January 21	Steven Universe	Cartoon Network	2013	Ended	
January 25	Unbreakable Kimmy Schmidt (returned in 2020)	Netflix	2015	Ended	
January 30	Ryan Hansen Solves Crimes on Television	YouTube Premium	2017	Cancelled	
February 17	Counterpart	Starz	2017	Cancelled	
February 17	Berlin Station	Epix	2016	Cancelled	
February 24	Avengers Assemble	Disney XD	2013	Ended	
February 26	Lethal Weapon	Fox	2016	Cancelled	
February 26	The Gifted	Fox	2017	Cancelled	
March 10	Crashing	HBO	2017	Ended	
March 11	The Passage	Fox	2019	Cancelled	
March 13	The World's Best	CBS	2019	Cancelled	
March 13	I'm Sorry	TruTV	2017	Cancelled	
March 15	Arrested Development	Netflix	2003	Cancelled	
March 19	Teachers	TV Land	2016	Ended	
March 20	Deadly Class	Syfyl	2019	Cancelled	
March 22	The OA	Netflix	2016	Cancelled	
March 24	Hot Streets	Adult Swim	2018	Cancelled	
March 28	Broad City	Comedy Central	2014	Ended	
March 29	Santa Clarita Diet	Netflix	2017	Cancelled	
March 31	SMILF	Showtime	2017	Cancelled	
April 3	You're the Worst	FXX	2014	Ended	
April 5	Crazy Ex-Girlfriend	The CW	2015	Ended	
April 8	Those Who Can't	TruTV	2016	Cancelled	
April 9	The Tick	Amazon Video	2016	Cancelled	
April 9	Splitting Up Together	ABC	2018	Cancelled	
April 11	Fam	CBS	2019	Cancelled	
April 12	Speechless	ABC	2016	Cancelled	
April 13	Bizaardvark	Disney Channel	2016	Ended	
April 18	Hollywood Medium With Tyler Henry	E!	2016	Ended	
April 20	Knight Squad	Nickelodeon	2018	Ended	
April 23	Being Mary Jane	BET	2013	Ended	
April 25	Gotham	Fox	2014	Ended	
April 26	Chambers	Netflix	2019	Cancelled	
April 29	Meet the Peetes	Hallmark Channel	2018	Cancelled	
May 6	Into the Badlands	AMC	2015	Ended	
May 6	Shadowhunters	Freeform	2016	Ended	
May 7	Pick'em	NFL Network	2016	Cancelled	
May 7	21st & Prime	NFL Network	2012	Cancelled	
May 7	Mic'd Up	NFL Network	2015	Cancelled	
May 7	Playbook	NFL Network	2017	Cancelled	
May 7	Power Rankings	NFL Network	2017	Cancelled	
May 8	Star	Fox	2016	Cancelled	
May 10	Proven Innocent	Fox	2019	Cancelled	
May 10	The Cool Kids	Fox	2018	Cancelled	
May 10	Sneaky Pete	Amazon Video	2015	Cancelled	
May 10	Easy	Netflix	2016	Ended	
May 10	The Society	Netflix	2019	Cancelled	
May 12	Veep	HBO	2012	Ended	
May 12	Now Apocalypse	Starz	2019	Cancelled	
May 13	Knightfall	History	2017	Cancelled	
May 16	The Big Bang Theory	CBS	2007	Ended	
May 16	Busy Tonight	E!	2018	Ended	
May 16	For the People	ABC	2018	Ended	
May 17	Mighty Magiswords	Cartoon Network	2016	Ended	
May 17	State of the Union	Sundance TV	2019	Ended	
May 18	Milo Murphy's Law	Disney Channel/Disney XD	2016	Ended	
May 19	The Red Line	CBS	2019	Ended	
May 19	Game of Thrones	HBO	2011	Ended	
May 19	Star vs. the Forces of Evil	Disney Channel/Disney XD	2015	Ended	
May 20	The Enemy Within	NBC	2019	Cancelled	
May 20	The Fix	ABC	2019	Cancelled	
May 21	The Kids Are Alright	ABC	2018	Cancelled	
May 21	The Village	NBC	2019	Cancelled	
May 22	Whiskey Cavalier	ABC	2019	Cancelled	
May 22	Pretty Little Liars: The Perfectionists	Freeform	2019	Cancelled	
May 24	She's Gotta Have It	Netflix	2017	Cancelled	
May 25	Ransom	CBS	2017	Cancelled	
May 25	The Inspectors	CBS	2015	Cancelled	
May 25	Last Call with Carson Daly	NBC	2002	Ended	
May 27	We Bare Bears	Cartoon Network	2015	Ended	
May 28	1969	ABC	2019	Ended	
May 29	Happy!	Syfy	2017	Cancelled	
May 30	Cloak & Dagger	Freeform	2018	Cancelled	
May 31	Buenos Días Familia	Estrella TV	2017	Cancelled	
May 31	Primera Edición	Estrella TV	2017	Cancelled	
May 31	Welcome to the Wayne	Nicktoons	2017	Cancelled	
May 31	Wu-Tang Clan: Of Mics and Men	Showtime	2019	Ended	
May 31	Who Wants to Be a Millionaire (returned in 2020)	First-run syndication	1999	Cancelled	
May 31	INN News	Youtoo America	2002	Cancelled	
June 6	Paradise Hotel	Fox	2003	Cancelled	
June 7	Designated Survivor	Netflix	2016	Cancelled	
June 7	Wyatt Cenac's Problem Areas	HBO	2018	Cancelled	
June 8	Game Shakers	Nickelodeon	2015	Cancelled	
June 8	Cousins for Life	Nickelodeon	2018	Cancelled	
June 9	Guardians of the Galaxy	Disney XD	2015	Ended	
June 13	Abby's	NBC	2019	Cancelled	
June 14	Jessica Jones	Netflix	2015	Ended	
June 16	The Powerpuff Girls	Cartoon Network	2016	Ended	
June 22	Death at the Mansion: Rebecca Zahau	Oxygen	2019	Ended	
June 23	The Jellies!	Adult Swim	2017	Cancelled	
June 24	The Amazing World of Gumball (returned in 2025)	Cartoon Network	2011	Ended	
June 26	Steve (returned in 2020)	First run syndication	2017	Cancelled	
June 27	Life in Pieces	CBS	2015	Cancelled	
June 28	Whistleblower	CBS	2018	Cancelled	
June 29	Murder and Justice: The Case of Martha Moxley	Oxygen	2019	Ended	
June 29	The Son	AMC	2017	Ended	
July 12	3Below: Tales of Arcadia	Netflix	2018	Ended	
July 19	Veronica Mars	Hulu	2004	Cancelled	
July 20	Mickey Mouse	Disney Channel	2013	Ended	
July 21	Big Little Lies	HBO	2017	Ended	
July 22	The Code	CBS	2019	Cancelled	
July 25	Strange Angel	CBS All Access	2018	Cancelled	
July 26	Andi Mack	Disney Channel	2017	Ended	
July 26	Orange Is the New Black	Netflix	2013	Ended	
July 29	Twelve Forever	Netflix	2019	Cancelled	
July 31	Wahlburgers	A&E	2014	Ended	
July 31	Jane the Virgin	The CW	2014	Ended	
August 1	iZombie	The CW	2015	Ended	
August 2	Swamp Thing	DC Universe	2019	Cancelled	
August 3	Million Dollar Mile	CBS	2019	Cancelled	
August 5	No Good Nick	Netflix	2019	Cancelled	
August 5	Divorce	HBO	2016	Ended	
August 6	Drunk History	Comedy Central	2013	Cancelled	
August 9	GLOW	Netflix	2017	Cancelled	
August 9	Dora the Explorer	Nickelodeon	2000	Cancelled	
August 12	Legion	FX	2017	Ended	
August 14	Krypton	Syfy	2018	Cancelled	
August 14	The InBetween	NBC	2019	Cancelled	
August 15	Elementary	CBS	2012	Ended	
August 16	Mindhunter	Netflix	2017	Ended	
August 18	Sweetbitter	Starz	2018	Cancelled	
August 20	The Detour	TBS	2016	Cancelled	
August 22	Baskets	FX	2016	Ended	
August 25	Instinct	CBS	2018	Cancelled	
August 26	Leah Remini: Scientology and the Aftermath	A&E	2016	Ended	
August 28	Harlots	Hulu	2017	Cancelled	
August 29	I Ship It	CW Seed	2019	Cancelled	
August 30	The Dark Crystal: Age of Resistance	Netflix	2019	Cancelled	
September 6	Vice News Tonight	HBO	2016	Cancelled	
September 6	OK K.O.! Let's Be Heroes	Cartoon Network	2017	Cancelled	
September 6	Niko and the Sword of Light	Amazon Video	2017	Ended	
September 9	Grand Hotel	ABC	2019	Cancelled	
September 11	BH90210	Fox	2019	Cancelled	
September 13	Reef Break	ABC	2019	Cancelled	
September 13	Page Six TV	First run syndication	2017	Cancelled	
September 18	Pearson	USA Network	2019	Cancelled	
September 20	Killjoys	Syfy	2015	Ended	
September 25	Suits	USA Network	2011	Ended	
September 27	Transparent	Amazon Video	2014	Ended	
September 29	Preacher	AMC	2016	Ended	
October 11	Insatiable	Netflix	2018	Cancelled	
October 12	My Little Pony: Friendship Is Magic	Discovery Family	2010	Ended	
October 13	Ballers	HBO	2015	Ended	
October 14	Lodge 49	AMC	2018	Cancelled	
October 16	Impulse	YouTube Premium	2018	Cancelled	
October 20	On Becoming a God in Central Florida	Showtime	2019	Cancelled	
October 24	Daybreak	Netflix	2019	Cancelled	
October 28	The Deuce	HBO	2017	Ended	
November 3	The Affair	Showtime	2014	Ended	
November 3	The Lion Guard	Disney Jr.	2015	Ended	
November 5	Battle of the Fittest Couples	Paramount Network	2019	Cancelled	
November 13	Limetown	Facebook Watch	2019	Cancelled	
November 15	Llama Llama	Netflix	2018	Cancelled	
November 15	The Man in the High Castle	Amazon Video	2015	Ended	
November 19	The Jim Jefferies Show	Comedy Central	2017	Ended	
November 19	Sorry for Your Loss	Facebook Watch	2018	Cancelled	
November 22	Trolls: The Beat Goes On!	Netflix	2018	Ended	
November 24	Wacky Races	Boomerang	2017	Cancelled	
November 25	Bluff City Law	NBC	2019	Cancelled	
November 28	Merry Happy Whatever	Netflix	2019	Cancelled	
December 1	EastSiders	Netflix	2012	Ended	
December 5	V Wars	Netflix	2019	Cancelled	
December 5	Sunnyside	NBC.com	2019	Cancelled	
December 6	Astronomy Club: The Sketch Show	Netflix	2019	Cancelled	
December 6	Reprisal	Hulu	2019	Cancelled	
December 8	Silicon Valley	HBO	2014	Ended	
December 8	Madam Secretary	CBS	2014	Ended	
December 11	Castle Rock	Hulu	2018	Cancelled	
December 13	Runaways	Hulu	2017	Ended	
December 15	Watchmen	HBO	2019	Cancelled	
December 17	The Purge	USA Network	2018	Cancelled	
December 17	Treadstone	USA Network	2019	Cancelled	
December 18	Soundtrack	Netflix	2019	Cancelled	
December 18	Born This Way	A&E	2015	Ended	
December 20	Double Dare	Nickelodeon	1986	Cancelled	
December 22	Mr. Robot	USA Network	2015	Ended	
December 27	Nightly Business Report	PBS/APT/CNBC	1979	Ended	

=== Entering syndication in 2019 ===
A list of programs (current or canceled) that have accumulated enough episodes (between 65 and 100) or seasons (three or more) to be eligible for off-network syndication and/or basic cable runs.

Show	Seasons	In Production	Notes	Source
Blindspot	4	Yes		
Bob's Burgers	9	Yes	Moving from broadcast weekend-only distribution to daily strip	
Chicago Med	4	Yes		
