= Kierna Mayo =

American writer, editor and media executive

- Born: Brooklyn, New York, U.S.
- Occupations: Writer, editor, media executive
- Years active: 1990–present
- Known for: Ebony (editor-in-chief)
- Notable work: Honey magazine (co-founder)

Kierna Mayo is an American writer, editor, and media executive. She started her journalism career as a member of the original writing staff for The Source. Mayo co-founded the lifestyle magazine Honey in 1999, and was later the editor-in-chief of Ebony. Mayo is the vice president and executive editor of Random House and Roc Nation's imprint Roc Lit 101.

== Early life and education ==
Mayo was born and raised in Brooklyn, New York. She was a fan of hip-hop music during her adolescence, and attended high school at Murry Bergtraum High School with Q-Tip and Ali Shaheed Muhammad (of A Tribe Called Quest fame). She received her bachelor's degree from Hampton University.

== Career ==
Mayo's editorial career began in the early 1990s as an original member of the Mind Squad at The Source, where she worked for four years. Her writing frequently pushed back against sexism in the music industry and blanket criticism of hip hop. She then worked as an urban affairs reporter at City Limits.

In March 1999, she co-founded and was named the inaugural editor-in-chief of Honey, a bimonthly lifestyle and fashion periodical geared toward young multicultural women. She and her co-founder Joicelyn Dingle sold the magazine and ultimately shuttered it in 2003 due to creative differences with the new owner, as well as financial issues.

By 2000, Mayo had joined LikePepper.com, an e-zine, along with George Jackson. In the years following, Mayo worked as Senior Editor of Cosmogirl and was a founding member of the Hearst Diversity Council.

Mayo worked as Ebony's editorial director beginning in 2011 and was promoted to editor-in-chief in 2015. A few months into her tenure she attracted both praise and condemnation for a cover depicting the fictional Huxtable family of The Cosby Show in a smashed picture frame. The accompanying article, written by Goldie Taylor, contextualized Cliff Huxtable's legacy in light of the scores of women that accused Bill Cosby of sexual assault and misconduct. In 2016, Mayo resigned from her position after Ebony's owners sold the publication to ClearView Partners. Later that year, she was named senior vice president of content and brands for Interactive One.

In 2012, Mayo was nominated for Outstanding Magazine Article at the 23rd GLAAD Media Awards. Mayo was a honoree at the 2020 Equality Now Gala.

She is the vice president and executive editor at the publishing imprint One World/Roc Lit 101.

=== Other work ===
Mayo wrote the foreword to Joan Morgan's cultural history book, She Begat This: 20 Years of The Miseducation of Lauryn Hill (2018). She also contributed the essay “Hip-Hop Heroines” to the Smithsonian Anthology of Hip-Hip and Rap (2021).

Mayo appeared as a commentator for On the Record and We Need to Talk About Cosby.

She was previously a part of the human rights organization, Malcolm X Grassroots Movement.
