= On the Record (film) =

2020 documentary film

- Official poster
- Directed by: Kirby Dick; Amy Ziering
- Written by: Kirby Dick; Amy Ziering; Sara Newens
- Produced by: Kirby Dick; Amy Ziering; Amy Herdy; Jamie Rogers
- Cinematography: Ava Berkofsky; Thaddeus Wadleigh
- Edited by: Sara Newens
- Music by: Terence Blanchard
- Production companies: Warner Max; Impact Partners; Artemis Rising Foundation; Jane Doe Films; Level Forward; Shark Island Productions
- Distributed by: HBO Max
- Release dates: January 25, 2020 (Sundance); May 27, 2020 (United States)
- Running time: 95 minutes
- Country: United States
- Language: English

On the Record is a 2020 American documentary film directed by Kirby Dick and Amy Ziering. It centers on allegations of sexual abuse and harassment against hip-hop mogul Russell Simmons. Executive producer Oprah Winfrey publicly withdrew from the film shortly before it was released, citing "creative differences", severing a production deal with Apple TV+. The film premiered at Sundance on January 25, 2020, and was acquired by HBO Max, which released it digitally on May 27, 2020.

== Synopsis ==
The film centers on allegations of sexual assault and harassment levied against Def Jam co-founder Russell Simmons, and features interviews with some of the over 20 women who have accused him, including Sil Lai Abrams, Sherri Hines, Jenny Lumet, and Alexia Norton Jones. The documentary spends the bulk of its screen time on the story of Drew Dixon, a former A&R executive at Def Jam Records who claims that Simmons raped her in his apartment. After leaving the company to work for Arista Records, Dixon claims that music executive L.A. Reid sabotaged her career when she rejected his sexual advances. On the Record also highlights the erasure of black women's voices from the #MeToo movement.

Kimberlé Crenshaw, Kierna Mayo, and Tarana Burke offer commentary throughout the film.

== Background ==
On the Record is the fourth documentary released since the beginning of #MeToo that highlights allegations of sexual abuse against men in power, including Untouchable and the Surviving R. Kelly series. It is the third film directed by Kirby Dick and Amy Ziering about sexual assault, including The Invisible War and The Hunting Ground.

In 2016, Ziering served on the jury for the Sundance Film Festival. During a Women at Sundance dinner, Ziering was seated next to Rose McGowan, who shared with Ziering she had been sexually assaulted by Harvey Weinstein. Ziering asked McGowan if other women would speak. Later, Ziering and Dick flew to meet with Ashley Judd, and an unnamed actress, and began pitching the film around, where it was rejected.

Ziering and Dick put the project on hold, but when the #MeToo movement began, Ziering and Dick received calls from women willing to come forward, which is how they found Drew Dixon, the daughter of former Washington, D.C. mayor Sharon Pratt Kelly and former Chair of the Council of the District of Columbia, Arrington Dixon. Dixon was the first woman to publicly levy allegations of assault against Russell Simmons, which were detailed in a New York Times article published in December 2017.

== Production ==
In June 2019, Oprah Winfrey joined as an executive producer on the project under her Harpo Productions banner, with Apple TV+ acquiring distribution rights to the film as part of her overall deal with Apple. Ziering and Dick worked closely with Winfrey, sending her cuts, which received her enthusiastic approval.

Following the announcement of the film, Winfrey was targeted by Simmons and his supporters including 50 Cent, and she received phone calls and text messages from Simmons directly asking her to cancel the project. Additionally, the women involved with the film were targeted on social media, which the women viewed as attempts to threaten and intimidate them.

In January 2020, Winfrey announced she would be withdrawing as an executive producer on the project, which resulted in the cancellation of the film's distribution deal with Apple TV+. She stated that she felt the film was being rushed to be shown at the Sundance Film Festival, and after Ava DuVernay critiqued it negatively after a private screening, Winfrey felt the documentary lacked proper "context", and that there were "inconsistencies" in some of the women's stories. Winfrey only informed Ziering and Dick of her departure 20 minutes before making it public. They stated that they were blindsided, as Winfrey had seen a cut similar to the one that would premiere at Sundance, with Apple and Harpo filling out an application for the festival.

Kirby Dick told The Guardian, "These stories were reported by the New York Times, the LA Times and The Hollywood Reporter and very extensively vetted.” According to Dick and Ziering, that process included their own fact-checking team, Harpo Productions, Apple's lawyers, and HBO Max's legal team.

== Release ==
=== Premiere and release ===
On the Record premiered at Sundance on January 25, 2020. Shortly after, HBO Max acquired distribution rights to the film and released it digitally on May 27, 2020.

=== Critical reception ===
The film has received positive reception. The directors received a standing ovation after the premiere at Sundance. On review aggregator website Rotten Tomatoes, the film holds an approval rating of 99% based on 73 reviews, with an average rating of 8.2/10. The site's critics consensus reads: "On the Record uses harrowing first-person accounts to powerfully and persuasively confront the entrenched sexism of an industry and its culture." On Metacritic, the film has a weighted average score of 84 out of 100, based on 22 critic reviews, indicating "universal acclaim".

Writing for Vanity Fair, Jordan Hoffman called it, "a thorough and self-aware film." Ann Hornaday, The Washington Post's chief film critic, called it "not just a riveting piece of investigative filmmaking, but a comprehensive and crucially important historical text". The New York Times critic, Devika Girish, observed, "What the film does is bring these accounts to living, breathing and moving life, taking us beyond the media cycles of allegation and denial to a survivor’s intimate confrontations with cultural pressures and trauma." Leah Greenblatt of EW gave the film an A− and referred to the film as "brutal, heartbreaking, and—with or without Oprah’s co-sign—utterly necessary."

In a review for Variety, Owen Gleiberman stated, "If 'On the Record' were simply a record of sexual harassment and violence, it would end there. But the movie plunges deeper than perhaps any #MeToo narrative we’ve seen into the tortured ambivalence that women who’ve been victimized feel about calling out their accusers." Writing for The A.V. Club, Noel Murray gave the film a B+.
