= Sil Lai Abrams =

American activist (born 1970)

- Born: July 13, 1970 (age 56); Maui, Hawaii
- Occupation: Writer
- Known for: Domestic violence awareness activism

Sil Lai Abrams (née Baber; born July 13, 1970) is a domestic violence awareness activist and National Association of Black Journalists (NABJ) award-winning writer. Abrams is a sought after speaker on sexual assault, domestic violence, race, and depictions of women of color in the media and has spoken at over 300 organizations and universities around the United States. She regularly provides television commentary on gender violence and has been profiled in numerous magazines, including The Hollywood Reporter, EBONY, Redbook, Modern Woman, and ESSENCE. The Root praised Abrams for her use of “social media to protest the narrative that Black women’s realities can be defined by dysfunctional entertainment”, and she has served on the Board of Directors for two of the nation’s largest victim services nonprofit organizations, Safe Horizon and the National Domestic Violence Hotline.

Abrams is a survivor of sexual assault and domestic violence, which prompted her to begin volunteering in domestic violence shelters beginning in the mid-2000s. Since 2007, her work has been primarily focused on gender violence awareness and prevention in the Black community.

== Early life ==
Abrams was born in Maui, Hawaii. The father listed on her birth certificate is a white former U.S. Army serviceman and her biological mother is a Hong Konger of Han Chinese descent. At age 14, Abrams learned that the man she called her father was not genetically related to her and that her biological father was Black and an Air America pilot. Her early experiences with race and identity play a significant role in her intersectional approach to her work on these subjects and the impact racism has on the overrepresented number of Black female victims of gender-violence.

In her late teens and early twenties, Abrams worked as a catalog fashion model and was represented by Page Parkes Models' Rep in Miami Beach, FL, and Dallas, TX, as well as Riccardo Gay in Milan, Italy where she primarily did runway work. Following her modeling career, Abrams began working in the entertainment event planning and marketing industry. She often paired celebrities with causes but found herself increasingly interested in working directly with survivors of gender violence. This inspired Abrams to begin volunteering in domestic violence shelters. Eventually, Abrams' volunteerism spurred her to become a full-time activist and advocate.

== Writing career ==
In 2007, Abrams published her first book, the self-help tome "No More Drama: Nine Simple Steps to Transforming a Breakdown into a Breakthrough", which describes how one can transform personal breakdowns into breakthroughs. In 2016, her second book entitled Black Lotus: A Woman's Search for Racial Identity was published by Gallery Books/Karen Hunter Publishing. The memoir recounted Abrams’ journey to discover and embrace herself in a family that sought to deny her Black heritage. Black Lotus was selected by NPR as one of their 2016 books of the year, and praised as a “searingly honest coming-of-age memoir” by Kirkus Reviews and a “page-turning” book that “memoir fans will devour” by Library Journal. The Los Angeles Review of Books stated “Her pain pulses on the page, and at the core of her unfolding is an undying hope that the truth of all that she is will be loved and accepted. If that is Abrams’s goal, then Black Lotus is a triumph.” The Wellesley Centers for Women’s Women’s Review of Books said: “Abrams ultimately finds a way to claim and hold onto her own sacredness and encourage others to embark on the journey that leads them to embrace their own.”

Abrams, is the former relationship expert for EBONY.com and Men’s Fitness, and a contributing writer for The Grio, The Daily Beast, HuffPost, Bitch magazine, and The Hollywood Reporter. In 2012, her EBONY magazine essay "Passing Strangely", which detailed her experience of learning her true racial identity won the NABJ Salute to Excellence Award in the Commentary/Essay Category as part of the magazine's "Multiracial in America" package.

== Truth In Reality ==
Abrams founded the media advocacy organization Truth In Reality in 2012 to challenge the racially stereotypical media messaging of Black women and girls in an effort to reduce the cultural acceptance of gender-based violence in the Black community. Truth In Reality created and executed the Redefining HERstory national campus social action program. The purpose of the campaign was to challenge popular portrayals of violent and hyper-sexualized stereotypes of women of color in the media, with the goal of reducing the cultural acceptance of gender-based violence in the Black community. Their "Redefining HERstory Media Advocacy Toolkit" is promoted and relied on by UN Women as a part of its work to educate media consumers about the correlation between on-screen and real-world violence committed against Black women and girls.

Truth In Reality worked in partnership with Zeta Phi Beta and the American Advertising Federation as part of the “Get Engaged” campaign to promote a more fair and balanced depiction of African Americans in the media (cite). “Get Engaged” was rolled out in 8-cities and relied upon the Truth In Reality's Media Advocacy Toolkit as the framework for a series of facilitated reality television watch parties.

Since May 2017, Abrams has been on sabbatical from Truth In Reality following her acceptance as a McBride Scholar at Bryn Mawr College, where she is studying sociology and political science.

== Sexual assault allegations ==
On June 28, 2018, The Hollywood Reporter published an article about Abrams concerning the treatment of her allegations of rape by music mogul Russell Simmons in 1994 and sexual assault by former “EXTRA” television co-host A.J. Calloway in 2006. The story addressed how NBCUniversal, which was originally scheduled to publish her story in January 2018 during the height of the Me Too movement, suppressed her story under pressure from Simmons' attorneys.

=== Simmons allegations ===
In response to Abrams’s assault allegations, Simmons has asserted his innocence, although a rape kit was done at the time of the assault. Abrams, a former Def Jam employee, is a primary subject in On the Record, a documentary directed by filmmakers Kirby Dick and Amy Ziering, known for their acclaimed films on sexual assault, such as The Hunting Ground and The Invisible War. “On The Record” focuses on the challenges Black women face when reporting sexual violence, and centers on the numerous allegations of rape and assault committed by Simmons. The film received multiple standing ovations when it premiered at the Sundance Film Festival in January 2020. The critically acclaimed documentary is being distributed by HBO Max and will stream on the new network on May 27, 2020.

=== Calloway allegations ===
Calloway has also denied Abrams’ allegations, although he was arrested and charged for the alleged assault. Calloway’s case was dismissed on procedural grounds when a judge ruled that the Brooklyn District Attorney's Office had violated his right to a fair and speedy trial.

After an initial investigation that did not result in action against Calloway, WarnerMedia, EXTRA’s parent company, announced it had suspended Calloway in February 2019. The company cited “additional allegations brought to our attention,” after it had expanded its initial inquiries following Abrams’ story in The Hollywood Reporter. When WarnerMedia CEO John Stankey was featured in a cover story for Variety, Abrams called out the company's inaction on Twitter: “Why has @WarnerMediaGrp failed to release the finding of the investigation into your employee’s history of alleged criminal sexual violence?” and “Is Mr. Calloway still a paid employee of your television division?” Calloway was reportedly let go from “EXTRA” after an internal investigation was executed as a result of Abrams’ continued efforts to have the company address the reporting of her and several other women's alleged sexual assaults. In a statement following Calloway’s dismissal, Abrams said: “Had I not tweeted about Mr. Stankey, I doubt Warner Bros. would have taken the initiative to let my lawyer know the outcome of the investigation. It should not be incumbent upon survivors to force companies to do the right thing.”

== Personal life ==
Abrams is the mother of two adult children. She has been open with her early struggles with alcoholism and has not had a drink since November 1994. She is also a member of the Baháʼí Faith. She graduated from Bryn Mawr College with honors on May 29, 2021.

== Bibliography ==
- No More Drama: Nine Simple Steps to Transforming a Breakdown into a Breakthrough (2007, Sepia Press Publishing)
- Black Lotus: A Woman's Search for Racial Identity (2016, Gallery Books/Karen Hunter Publishing)

== See also ==
- National Domestic Violence Hotline
