= WZLR =

1980s classic hits radio station in Xenia, Ohio, United States

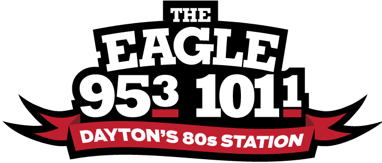
- Xenia, Ohio; United States
- Broadcast area: Dayton, Ohio
- Frequency: 95.3 MHz
- RDS: The Eagle Artists Title
- Branding: 953 and 1011 The Eagle

Programming
- Language: English
- Format: Classic hits

Ownership
- Owner: Cox Media Group; (CMG Radio Operating Company, LLC)
- Sister stations: WHIO; WHIO-FM; WHIO-TV; WHKO

History
- First air date: 1974
- Former call signs: WBZI (1974–1988); WDJK (1988–1993); WZLR (1993–2000); WDTP (2000–2002)
- Call sign meaning: "Clear", from former simulcast of WCLR

Technical information
- Licensing authority: FCC
- Facility ID: 15649
- Class: A
- ERP: 6,000 watts
- HAAT: 98 m (322 ft)
- Transmitter coordinates: 39°37′52.2″N 83°53′38.7″W
- Repeater: 99.1 WHKO-HD2 (Dayton)

Links
- Public license information: Public file; LMS
- Webcast: Listen live; Listen live (via Audacy)
- Website: www.eagledayton.com

WZLR (95.3 FM), known as "The Eagle," is a radio station broadcasting a 1980s classic hits format currently owned by Cox Media Group. Licensed to Xenia, Ohio, United States, it serves the Dayton area. According to the Federal Communications Commission's website, the station has transmitted with an effective radiated power of 6,000 watts since 1998. Its studios are co-located with other Cox Media properties in the Cox Media Center building near downtown Dayton. WZLR's transmitter is located in Xenia and translator on the WHIO-TV tower in Germantown, Ohio.

== History ==
=== Country (1967–1979) ===
The station's original call sign was WBZI, the FM sister of WGIC. As early as 1967 the station played country music and even published a countdown chart called the "Flashy 40".

=== Top 40 (1979–1980) ===
At some point in the later part of the 1970s the station flipped to an automated top 40 format using TM's "Stereo Rock" format. At the same time WDJX, located in the same city of license of Xenia hit the air with a top 40 format using local jocks and quickly became a top-rated station in the market, casting a shadow over WBZI's top 40 efforts.

=== Country (1980–1988) ===
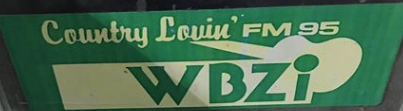
This is one of the original WBZI logos during the country format in the early to mid-1980s.

Following a format and AM/FM frequency swap the station switched to country in 1980. It had its highest success as country in the early 1980s; however, its ratings always trailed those of WONE, the leader in the country music format in the Dayton metro. The station tried a "progressive country" called "Country Lovin'" mixing in the big acts of the day with country/rock crossovers like Marshall Tucker and The Eagles. The station had a successful run being at points the only FM country station in the Dayton area.

=== Adult Contemporary (1988–1990) ===
In 1988 the station flipped from country to a national adult contemporary satellite format from ABC Radio Networks. It had low ratings since both WVUD-FM and WWSN-FM were successful adult contemporary stations, and had full market signal penetration while WDJK did not. In the latter part of 1989 the station dropped the satellite format in favor of local AC. During the year the station began adding contemporary hit radio songs to its mix.

=== Top 40 (1990–1993) ===
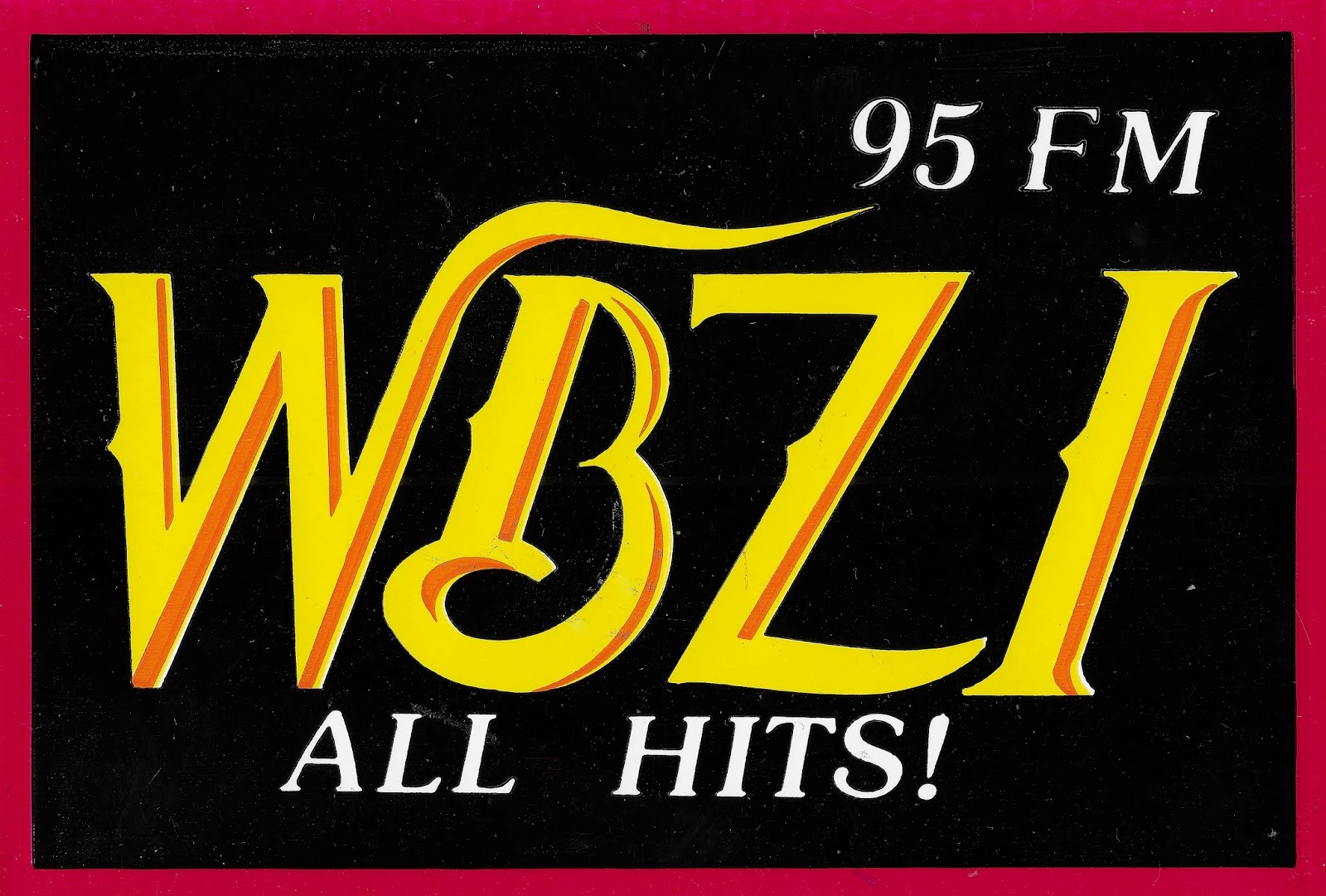
The "All Hits" WBZI logo used during its late '70s top 40 era

In the latter part of 1990, the station became mainstream contemporary hit radio (CHR/pop) "DJ 95". The station kept this name until June 1992, when it was changed to "Power 95", following the playing of Boyz II Men's "It's So Hard To Say Goodbye To Yesterday" 953 times in a row.

=== Formats after pending sale (1993) ===
The CHR/pop format lasted until July 1993, when the station was put up for sale, at which time the station decided to flip to 1980s oldies, the first time such a format had been tried in the country. However, with the format only lasting less than a month and the station already pending a sale, it's regarded to more of a stunt than a full-fledged format flip. On August 10, 1993, Night Ranger's "Goodbye" was played and the 1980s oldies stunt was dropped along with the entire airstaff, in favor of an FM simulcast of sister station WBZI, retaining the WDJK calls. For several months WBZI was simulcast on 95.3 until the sale closed.

=== Oldies (1993–2000) ===
The station's new owner was Dick Hunt (owner of WCLR and WPTW in Piqua, Ohio) and eventually it operated as a simulcast with Piqua's WCLR "Kool 95", becoming WZLR. In 1998, the station was sold to Cox Media Group and tweaks to the format were made including a branding change to "Oldies 95" in its final year of operation.

=== '80s hits (2000–2002) ===
In October 2000 the station changed callsigns to WDTP repeating WDPT "Dayton's Point" playing 1980s adult hits until September 2002. The format was the brainchild of former WRBQ Tampa program director Randy Kabrich, and was also used by Cox stations in other markets, including Houston. The simulcast was branded as "95.7 Northside and 95.3 Southside". The Point continued on WDPT until October 30, 2006, when the station became a simulcast of WHIO (AM).

=== Classic rock (2002–2018) ===
In September 2002, WDTP flipped to classic rock after a full day of stunting with the opening riffs of Queen's "We Will Rock You" playing in the background and reverting to the WZLR calls. The station used a "no DJ" approach and promoted the fact they were Dayton's first radio station without DJs. In 2006, the station rebranded as "The Eagle" as well as retaining the WZLR calls. Mostly music of the 1970s and 1960s was played at this time with core artists featuring Fleetwood Mac, Bob Seger, The Eagles and The Doobie Brothers.

As many stations across America were phasing out 1960s and 1970s music, in a gradual fashion to keep the core demographics younger, the station did a more drastic change. On Thursday, January 7, 2010, following the Bubba the Love Sponge Show, the station shifted its focus to the 1980s using the slogan, "Now more '80s and the same great '70s". It also included short intercuts of old radio imaging from WZDA, WTUE and WGTZ (Z-93). The connection was made to the stations playing hit music in the late 1970s and 1980s in the market. The first song played after the format change was "Nothin' but a Good Time" by Poison. Core artists included Def Leppard, Billy Joel, REO Speedwagon, Foreigner, Journey, The Police, Van Halen, John Mellencamp, Phil Collins, Bryan Adams and Aerosmith. On June 1, 2012, the station changed its positioning to "'80s Rock Hits". On May 1, 2018, the station posted on its Facebook page that "We're not gonna take it anymore", in reference to Twisted Sister song and tweaked the format to more of a harder based classic rock. The new core artists are Mötley Crüe, Def Leppard, Van Halen and Aerosmith. The station returned to using the "Dayton's 80's Rock" positioning. Much of the new imaging sounds like the original Scott Shannon Pirate Radio KQLZ in Los Angeles; the top of the hour includes the "Welcome to the Jungle" reference heard in the KQLZ legal IDs. The last song on this era of WZLR's Classic Rock format was Led Zeppelin's "Stairway to Heaven."

=== Classic hits (2018–present) ===
On October 15, 2018, at 5:00 pm, WZLR shifted its to format from classic rock to a traditional classic hits station similar to the common format heard on stations like KRTH-FM Los Angeles and WCBS-FM New York. Core artists on the new format include Michael Jackson, Madonna, Hall & Oates, Prince and Journey. The station plays a wide variety from dance to alternative including pop and rock standards. The first song of the new format is Michael Jackson's "Wanna Be Starting Something." The move places the station in direct competition with Aloha Station Trust's WRZX "Big 106.5", however WRZX's tower location is more than 40 miles (64 km) northwest of Dayton near Greenville, compared to WZLR's signal which is located just south of Xenia. On May 4, 2020, WRZX flipped formats to traditional 1960s oldies leaving WZLR all to itself in the Dayton market playing classic hits. WRZX flipped to religious programming on August 2, 2021.

==== Bubba The Love Sponge ====
In March 2009, the station added the nationally syndicated Bubba the Love Sponge morning show. Bubba the Love Sponge was dropped from the station on March 2, 2011. According to AllAccess.com, the station completed its evolution to its new format and listener demand for music in the morning.

==== The Eagle Morning Zoo ====
Dr. Dave and "The Eagle Morning Zoo" started on February 6, 2017. Dr. Dave was the host of the original "Z Morning zoo" on WGTZ (Z-93) from the mid-1980s to the early 1990s. One week later, "Wild Bill" Cox, who had been Dr. Dave's WGTZ sidekick in the mid 1980s, joined the show. In September Alan Kaye, also on the original WGTZ "Z Morning Zoo", joined the program. The last show with Dr. Dave aired on December 4, 2017.

On December 5, 2017, the station went back to all music in the morning with the announcement that Todd Hollst would be the new host of the Morning Zoo starting on January 4, 2018. That show ended in the summer of 2018. The station has off and on referred to the morning show as The Eagle Morning Zoo, although the format is not similar to the traditional shows of that name as they play up to 14 songs an hour in morning drive.

The current incarnation of the Eagle Morning Zoo is English Nick who also hosts a show on WSRV The River in Atlanta. Brittany Otto handles news and also serves as the main morning news anchor for WHIO radio.

==== Commercial Free Weekends ====
Starting in September 2014, the station has employed "commercial-free weekends." For the entire day Saturday and Sunday there are no commercials on the station. The decision to go commercial-free on weekends was inspired by WBMP Radio in New York, first recommended by Cox Media Group national vice president of Radio Programming Steve Smith. That ended with the format change on October 15, 2018.

The station does currently employ "52 Minute Music Marathons." This tactic includes only one commercial break per hour with a 52-minute music sweep. This commercial load is much lower than many stations in the region.

=== Translator ===
In September 2013, the station began operating on translator W266BG on 101.1 MHz; with 100 watts. This translator was previously used by WSWO-LP. The translator is housed on the WHIO-TV tower in Germantown, Ohio which is grandfathered in by the FCC at 1,000 feet or 325 meters. Translators usually have a small broadcast range, but due to the abnormally high tower height, the signal is very strong with reception reports as far away as Urbana, Ohio and Jeffersonville, Ohio. The WHIO Germantown tower was grandfathered by the FCC at 1,000 feet in the late 1940s.

=== Streaming ===
In addition to the Eagle website, streaming via the iHeartRadio website and smartphone app was available since summer 2012. Subsequently, a smartphone app solely for "The Eagle" was launched the following summer. This app allows listeners to not only hear the station's stream, but access features such as: "Open Mic," which records up to ten seconds of a listener's voice and could be used for playback on-air, either in station promos or prior to song requests; "Alarm Clock", which automatically starts playing the station's stream at a time preset by the listener; and the opportunity to vote on songs in the station's playlist, including which songs are featured on the regular playlist.

=== Cleveland Browns Football ===
On November 1, 2018, station management announced that the station was the new home of the Cleveland Browns on the radio in Dayton. They cited feedback from team fans in the market on the absence of Browns football available on the radio. Sister station WHIO was the former home of the Browns, and their agreement ended at the end of the 2018 season. For the 2020 season, WHIO again started carrying Browns football along with WZLR. Both stations play the pre-game show and the game, but only WHIO playing the Postgame Show with The Eagle returning back to music directly after the game ending. As of 2021, WHIO radio became the exclusive radio affiliate of the Browns with WZLR no longer carries the team.

== See also ==
- Cox Radio
- WBZI
- WHIO-FM
- WPTW
