= Springfield News-Sun =

Newspaper in Springfield, Ohio

- Clark and Champaign Counties' Hometown News

- Front page of March 4, 2019
- Type: Daily newspaper
- Owner: Cox Enterprises
- Publisher: Suzanne Klopfenstein
- Editor: Ben McLaughlin
- Headquarters: Springfield, Ohio
- ISSN: 0744-6101
- Website: www.springfieldnewssun.com

The Springfield News-Sun is a daily newspaper published in Springfield, Ohio, by Cox Enterprises, which also publishes the Dayton Daily News. Both newspapers contain similar editorial content, but tailor their local news coverage to the area served. The News-Sun primarily serves Springfield and Urbana, in southwestern Ohio. While the Springfield News-Sun's newsroom is in downtown Springfield, the newspaper is published in Dayton.

The newspaper has won nearly 100 Ohio Associated Press Awards, including a General Excellence Award. Nearly 90% of adults in Clark County read the Springfield News-Sun over the course of a month. Its website, SpringfieldNewsSun.com, is updated 7 days a week and features local breaking news.

== History ==
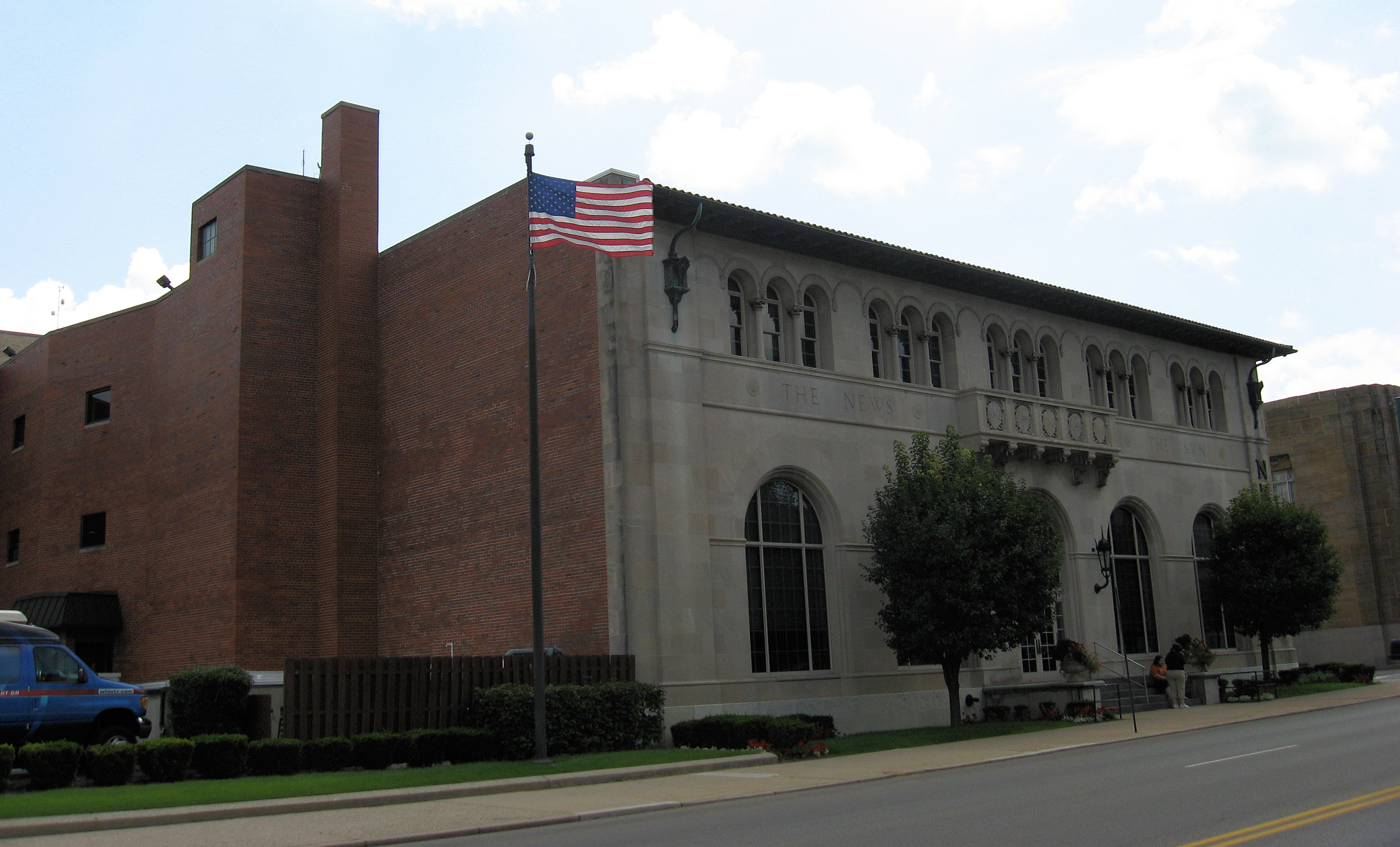
The former Springfield News-Sun building in Springfield, Ohio

Springfield's daily newspaper has been serving residents of Clark and Champaign counties since 1817. The newspaper's lineage can be traced back to the first publication in Clark County called The Farmer. Over the 1800s and 1900s the name would change several times. The Springfield Daily Democrat merged with The Press Republic in 1905 eventually becoming The Springfield Daily News; The Springfield Daily News and The Sun publications merged in 1982 to form the current name Springfield News-Sun, making this one of the longest continuously-running newspaper publications in the region.

In late 2010, Cox Enterprises merged all of its local media holdings under the CMG Ohio brand and consolidated locations to the Cox Media Group Ohio Media Center in Dayton. In addition to its print publications, holdings include broadcast media WHIO-TV, MeTV WHIO Classic Television and radio stations WHIO (AM)-FM, K99.1FM WHKO, and WZLR The Eagle.

In 2019, Cox Enterprises sold the company's portfolio of media, radio and television to Apollo Global Management, Inc., which included the sale of Cox's Ohio newspapers. After the initial sale of the newspapers, the Federal Communications Commission said that Apollo would have to stop publishing a daily newspaper in the Dayton market to comply with new FCC rulings about companies owning television, radio and newspapers in the same market. In early 2020, Cox Enterprises repurchased the Dayton Daily News, Springfield News-Sun and Journal-News, which allowed the newspapers to continue printing 7 days a week.

In March 2020, Jana Collier was named publisher of the newly formed Ohio Newspapers brand. Upon her retirement at the end of 2022, Suzanne Klopfenstein was named the new publisher and assumed her role in the beginning of 2023. Klopfenstein has 30 years of media experience, including serving as the senior director of sales for Cox First Media. Ashley Bethard became editor and chief content officer of Cox First Media in January 2022.

On March 5, 2023, the newspaper announced that, due to cost issues, starting on May 6, it would no longer produce printed newspapers on Saturdays. Digital products, including its online newspaper (branded as ePaper which is available online or in the company's app), would continue to be published on Saturdays.
