= WPTW =

Radio station in Piqua, Ohio

- Piqua, Ohio; United States
- Broadcast area: Miami County; Miami Valley
- Frequency: 1570 kHz
- Branding: Greatest Hits 98.1 WPTW

Programming
- Format: Classic hits
- Affiliations: ABC News Radio; The Weather Channel; United Stations Radio Networks; Ohio State Sports Network

Ownership
- Owner: Muzzy Broadcasting Group

History
- First air date: December 7, 1947; 78 years ago
- Call sign meaning: W Piqua, Troy and W est Milton

Technical information
- Licensing authority: FCC
- Facility ID: 70521
- Class: B
- Power: 250 watts unlimited
- Transmitter coordinates: 40°8′25″N 84°16′7″W
- Translator: 98.1 W251BC (Piqua)

Links
- Public license information: Public file; LMS
- Webcast: Listen live
- Website: www.981wptw.com

WPTW (1570 AM "The Voice of the Upper Miami Valley, Ohio" (for Piqua, Troy and West Milton)) is a commercial AM radio station in Piqua, Ohio, United States, with a power output of 250 watts. It is owned by Muzzy Broadcasting Group. ABC News Radio and local news from Justin Falin. Its music format is a mix of 1970s', 1980s' and 90s for flavor ' Greatest hits. Local high school sports coverage remains a tradition at the station in addition to Ohio State Buckeyes football.

== History ==
=== Sign-on and early years ===
WPTW began operation as a daytime-only AM station with a middle of the road format on December 7, 1947 and was founded by the Miami Valley Broadcasting Company. It operated with extended hours during the November 1950 blizzard.

For much of its early years, WPTW held the distinction as the only commercial radio station in the Upper Miami Valley between Dayton and Lima; as such, the station opened up several locally originating studios in its service area including the Hotel Lollis in Troy, the Ohio Building in Sidney, and a studio on South Broadway in Greenville. That distinction was held until the late 1950s and early 1960s with the founding of stations in Bellefontaine, Sidney, Greenville, Urbana and Wapakoneta; the auxiliary studios were closed by the mid-1960s.

In 1960, WPTW gained an FM sister station, WPTW-FM 95.7. The two stations initially simulcast a traditional middle of the road format, played out from a sophisticated reel-to-reel automation system, with a few minor exceptions for separate programming on WPTW; WPTW-FM became a beautiful music station later in the 1960s and is today's WHIO-FM. The syndicated "Dell-O Morning Show" hosted by Dell Olney was pre-recorded onto automation tapes. (By the mid-1960s, WPTW-FM In the mid-1970s, there was also a live weekday afternoon show on 1570 AM hosted by Dave Brennan (later of Dayton's WING). The vintage on-air studio gear (a Collins tube-type audio console with original transmitter and Gates transcription turntables almost dating back to the station's beginnings) were properly maintained in mint condition thanks to longtime chief engineer Don Kuether and remained in use until upgrades were made in the late 1970s and 80s.

=== Separate business ventures ===
WPTW also founded and grandfathered WCSM and WCSM-FM in Celina in 1964 (currently owned by Buzzards Media, LLC, Inc.). By this time WPTW was locally owned and operated by Richard Hunt and C. Oscar Baker, doing business as WPTW Radio, Inc.

Hunt also owned WSOO and WSUE in Sault Sainte Marie, Michigan and Valley Antenna Systems (aka: Piqua CATV) as separate entities in addition to becoming the sole owner of WPTW following Baker's passing in 1974. Hunt sold WPTW to Frontier Broadcasting and WCLR-FM to Cox Radio (dba: Xenia Broadcasting) in 1997 several years before his passing in 2002. Steve Baker, who is the northern bureau chief for WHIO-TV's NewsCenter 7, had his start at WPTW's news department in the early 1970s.

WPTW was previously a CBS Radio Network affiliate since the time it was dropped by WHIO in favor of affiliating with Fox News Radio. Beforehand, WPTW's network affiliations included Metromedia Radio in the 1960s, UPI Audio Network in the 1970s and 1980s, Unistar Radio in the 1990s and currently with ABC News Radio. WPTW was an affiliate of the Agri Broadcast Network and now is aligned with its successor, Ohio Ag-Net.

=== 24-hour operation and sale to Muzzy ===
In 1986, WPTW began operating 24 hours a day with full power, following a decision by the FCC to allow local stations operating on Mexican clear-channel frequencies to continue operation during nighttime hours with their normal licensed power. It is currently an affiliate of The True Oldies Channel featuring hits from the 1960s, 1970s, and 1980s but for most of its years, it maintained a traditional middle of the road format until the 1980s when it slowly began moving towards adult contemporary occasionally switching to adult standards in the 1990s, then back to its previous format mixed with 1950s/60s oldies (a satellite-delivered format from ABC Radio called "Unforgettable Favorites," which has since been discontinued). 1570 WPTW for several years broadcast in C-QUAM AM stereo in the 1990s which was later abandoned by 2000.

In 2007, Miami Valley Radio, LLC, headed by Mark Hiner, purchased WPTW from Frontier Broadcasting, which was headed by Bart Johnson, son of the late farm broadcaster and ABN founder Ed Johnson.

According to a Piqua Daily Call story dated July 8, 2011, owner Miami Valley Radio LLC announced that it may leave the air and shut down permanently unless a buyer is found. The story was also posted on its website several weeks after rumors abounded of the station making several on-air announcements in June 2011 that it may go silent. Rick Muzzy's Muzzy Broadcasting purchased the station in December 2011, and FCC approval was granted on April 20, 2012. Rick Muzzy was a familiar name and voice on WPTW in the 1970s.

WPTW is the last locally originating commercial radio station still serving Miami County as the former WPTW-FM is now WHIO-FM and the former short-lived competitor WTRJ-FM (later WRNB) in nearby Troy which is now WYDA, a repeater of K-LOVE. 1570 WPTW continues to serve Piqua, Troy, Sidney and the Upper Miami Valley with local news plus local and area high school sports coverage. Tom Michaels and Ryan Brandt and others anchor the local live sporting events for the station. The station is now an affiliate for the Ohio State Buckeyes airing all Football games.

Muzzy Broadcasting purchased a 98.1 FM translator in Sidney from the Educational Media Foundation in September 2012. The FM returned to the air on March 22, 2013 rebroadcasting WPTW.

== See also ==
- WHIO-FM (originally WPTW-FM, later WCLR and WDPT respectively)
- WUCO (now WDLR) Marysville, WLOH Lancaster and WQCD (AM) Delaware (formerly owned by Frontier Broadcasting)
- Scott Shannon
- List of radio stations in Ohio
- WSPT, WCWB, WPCN (also owned by Muzzy Broadcasting)
