= WHIO =

WHIO may refer to:

- WHIO-TV, a television station (PSIP channel 7/RF channel 33) licensed to Dayton, Ohio, United States
- WHIO (AM), a radio station (1290 AM) licensed to Dayton, Ohio, United States
- WHIO-FM, a radio station (95.7 FM) licensed to Pleasant Hill, Ohio, United States
- Blue duck, also called the "whio"
