= WTGR =

- Union City, Ohio; United States
- Broadcast area: Greenville and Darke County plus Winchester and Randolph County, Indiana area.
- Frequency: 97.5 MHz
- Branding: Tiger Country 97.5; WTGR

Programming
- Format: Country music
- Affiliations: CNN Radio

Ownership
- Owner: Positive Radio Group of Ohio
- Sister stations: WBOL (AM) 1030 kHz (defunct as of 1996)

History
- Former call signs: WFOW (1989–1990); WBNN (1990–1991)
- Call sign meaning: W TiGeR

Technical information
- Licensing authority: FCC
- Facility ID: 15169
- Class: A
- ERP: 6,000 watts
- HAAT: 99.0 meters
- Transmitter coordinates: 40°11′32.00″N 84°47′58.00″W

Links
- Public license information: Public file; LMS
- Website: Official website

WTGR (97.5 FM) is a radio station broadcasting a country music format. Licensed to Union City, Ohio, United States; the station is currently owned by Positive Radio Group of Ohio and features programming from CNN Radio.

== History ==
The station went on the air as WFOW on November 13, 1989, later changing its call letters to WBNN on March 30, 1990, and to the current WTGR on April 23, 1991.

WTGR's transmitter is located in Union City just east of the Ohio-Indiana state line with its studios and offices located in a building which formerly housed a carpet business on Martin Street (State Route 571 East) in Greenville. Since the signal upgrade and retargeting of the former WDRK toward Dayton under later call letters WLSN, WBKI, WDJO-FM, WOLT, and, now, WTKD), WTGR remains as Darke County's only locally-originating, commercial radio station.

From 1993 to 1996, WTGR had an AM sister station, broadcasting daytime-only at 1030 kHz. With call letters WBNN, this sister station aired a combination of country music and farm news and information from Ed Johnson's ABN. In 1996, it was decided to return that AM license back to the FCC.

== Call sign history ==
The "WTGR" call letters and "Tiger Radio" nickname had been used originally at Top-Forty-formatted AM stations in Charleston and Point Pleasant, West Virginia, in the 1960s and, in the 1970s, at an AM station in Myrtle Beach, South Carolina. The current WTGR formerly employed a classic rock format as "97.5 The Tiger" before its switch to country, and the WBOL callsign is now used at an AM station in Bolivar, Tennessee.

WTGR was also the callsign for the University of Memphis Tigers' campus radio station (TGR for Tiger Radio) in the late 1960s and early 1970s as a low-power AM educational radio station with an effective radiated power of only 10 watts.
