= WHKO =

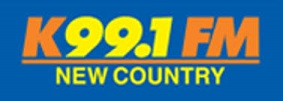
- Dayton, Ohio; United States
- Broadcast area: Dayton metropolitan area; Cincinnati metropolitan area
- Frequency: 99.1 MHz (HD Radio)
- Branding: K99.1FM

Programming
- Language: English
- Format: Country
- Subchannels: HD2: Classic hits (WZLR); HD3: Urban oldies
- Affiliations: Compass Media Networks

Ownership
- Owner: Cox Media Group; (CMG Radio Operating Company, LLC)
- Sister stations: WHIO; WHIO-FM; WHIO-TV; WZLR

History
- First air date: February 29, 1948
- Former call signs: WHIO-FM (1946–1989)
- Call sign meaning: A portmanteau of former WHIO call sign

Technical information
- Licensing authority: FCC
- Facility ID: 14245
- Class: B
- ERP: 50,000 watts
- HAAT: 325 meters (1,066 ft)
- Transmitter coordinates: 39.733944°N 84.248°W
- Translators: HD2: 101.1 W266BG (Dayton); HD3: 98.7 W254BA (Dayton)

Links
- Public license information: Public file; LMS
- Webcast: Listen live; HD3: Listen live
- Website: www.k99online.com; HD3: www.soulofdayton.com

WHKO (99.1 FM, "K99.1FM") is a commercial radio station in Dayton, Ohio. The station is owned by Cox Media Group and carries a country music radio format. Its studios and offices are co-located with the Dayton Daily News, WHIO-AM-FM-TV, and two more radio stations in the Cox Media Center building near downtown Dayton.

WHKO is considered a "Superpower FM" station; because it signed on in 1946, it is grandfathered with a bigger signal than most FM stations in Ohio. Its power, 50,000 watts, is the same as several FM stations in Dayton, and its height above average terrain (HAAT) at 325 meters (1,066 ft) is far above what would be allowed today, a maximum of 152 meters (499 ft) for that power. WHKO's transmitter is on Germantown Street in Dayton, on co-owned WHIO-TV's tower. The HD2 digital subchannel simulcasts WZLR's classic hits format. The HD3 subchannel plays urban oldies and feeds FM translator W254BA at 98.7 MHz.

== History ==
=== Early years ===
On February 29, 1948, the station signed on as WHIO-FM, the first FM station in Dayton and one of the first in Ohio. In its early years, it simulcast co-owned WHIO; as network programming moved from radio to television, WHIO-AM-FM switched to a full-service middle of the road format (MOR) of popular music, news and sports.

=== Beautiful music (1960s-1989) ===
In the 1960s, WHIO-FM switched to its own programming, a beautiful music format. It played quarter-hour sweeps of instrumental cover versions of popular songs, along with Broadway and Hollywood show tunes. As more people acquired FM radios, WHIO-FM was the top-rated station in the Dayton market for many years, playing reel to reel tapes of beautiful music provided by Bonneville International in Salt Lake City. It used a "live assist" system, where announcers listed the songs and gave news briefs and weather updates, but only talking briefly between the music.

In the 1980s, WHIO-FM's audience began to age, even though the overall ratings were strong. The 25-54 demographic, most sought after by advertisers, were slipping, so management decided to add more modern vocals, in an attempt to find younger listeners. Songs from The Eagles, Stevie Wonder, Carly Simon and Jim Croce were added. When this tactic failed, Cox Broadcasting decided to research the market for a format that Dayton listeners would respond to. Many easy listening and beautiful music stations evolved into soft adult contemporary stations. With WVUD 99.9 already in the soft AC format as "Delightful 100FM," Cox opted to instead change the format completely.

=== Country (1989–present) ===
On March 17, 1989, the station switched its call sign to WHKO, and the format abruptly changed from easy listening to country music. This was unexpected since the 12+ overall ratings still had WHIO-FM as the #1 station in the market. The last song played on WHIO-FM was Rick Astley's "Together Forever". The station then flipped to country music, although the announcer pre-sold another 30 minutes of easy listening favorites. The first song played under the new format was Barbara Mandrell's "I Was Country When Country Wasn't Cool". The first announcer on the station was Jim Manley who at that time moved from WHIO 1290 AM to mornings on the new K99.1FM. Nancy Wilson joined Manley short time later as co-host.

The previous format's audience, mainly older listeners, were very unhappy about the format change. The station received hundreds of complaint letters and numerous phone calls demanding to know why "FM 99" was playing country music. But after 2 ratings periods, K99.1FM was back to its number-one ranking in its target demographic of 25-54. Prior to the switch, the top-rated country station in Dayton through the 1970s and 1980s was WONE, which switched to an adult standards format.

At first, WHKO was "easy listening country", playing more soft crossover hits from Kenny Rogers, Linda Rondstadt, Rita Coolidge, Gordon Lightfoot and other soft rock and adult contemporary artists with a country background. The disk jockey style was laid back, at times sounding almost like the previous easy listening format. Over the next several years, the station slowly modernized the format with tight rotations, upbeat DJs and community involvement.

WHKO is the Dayton Children's Radiothon station the market and has raised over $4 million since 1998. WHKO won the National Association of Broadcasters Crystal Award in 2018 for outstanding community service. WHKO was only one of eight stations receiving the award. WHKO has also been nominated for several Academy of Country Music and Country Music Association awards.

In November 2006, the callsign WHIO-FM returned to the Dayton area from 95.7 FM in Piqua (formerly WDPT) as a simulcast of WHIO's news/talk format. The 95.7 facility had previously sought to capture the original WHIO-FM's audience when it abandoned the beautiful music format, converting from WPTW-FM to "Clear 95" with the callsign WCLR.

== HD Radio ==
WHKO broadcasts using HD Radio technology. The HD2 digital subchannel airs a simulcast of classic hits "The Eagle" 95.3 WZLR, along with translator W266BG on 101.1 MHz.

WHKO's HD3 subchannel is leased to BC Dayton Broadcasting as "The Soul of Dayton", a reference to the former WDAO-FM (now WMMX). It airs an urban oldies format. The service made its debut on Monday September 9, 2013, and is re-transmitted on FM translator W254BA on 98.7 MHz.
