= Gil Whitney =

American television personality (1940–1982)

- Whitney, c. 1980
- Born: Gilman Whitney; August 18, 1940; Augusta, Maine, U.S.
- Died: November 4, 1982 (aged 42); Dayton, Ohio, U.S.
- Occupations: Television personality Weather reporter (also fill-in news/sports anchor); Talk show emcee
- Known for: Timely weather warning during 1974 Super Outbreak co-founder of Dayton Air Show
- Spouse: Mary
- Children: Gil Jr., John, Jennifer

Gilman "Gil" Whitney (1940–1982) was an American television personality in Dayton, Ohio, who worked primarily at WHIO television and radio until his death in 1982. He was posthumously inducted into the Dayton Broadcasters Hall of Fame in 2005.

== Career ==
Whitney's career at WHIO was multi-faceted, having worked as an occasional fill-in news anchor, but also as a sportscaster and field journalist, usually covering stories of human interest. By the early 1970s he was permanently assigned as a weather specialist. His sense of humor and folksy everyman approach to weather reporting made him a favorite with viewers.

1976 TV Guide ad for Newscenter 7 with Gil Whitney

As a weatherman, Whitney is best remembered for his timely warning on April 3, 1974, of an F5 tornado that went through Xenia, Ohio, during the 1974 Super Outbreak. He specifically identified the Xenia neighborhood of Arrowhead as being directly in the tornado's path; his report proved to be correct as Arrowhead was leveled by the twister.

During the fall seasons, Whitney often referred to the wooly worm's supposed ability to predict the severity of an upcoming winter. His frequent reference to wooly worms led to the creation of a kids' fan club with the wooly worm as its mascot.

== Other work ==
During the summer months Whitney also hosted Summertime '7x (the number in the title changed each year), a weekly late-night talk show which featured local talent and other TV, movie and radio personalities making guest appearances. By 1980, the show was renamed The Gil Whitney Show. After his death the show was again renamed Summer Nights and ran five more years.

He was a regular on the community parade circuit, acted as emcee for numerous public events, volunteered as a firefighter, and most notably was one of the founders of the Dayton Air Show.

== Personal life and death ==
Whitney and his wife Mary had three children together:

- Gil Whitney Jr. (born 1963), a filmmaker now living in Cape Porpoise, Maine
- John, a filmmaker (born 1964), Columbus, Ohio
- Jennifer (born 1967)

Whitney died November 4, 1982, at the age of 42.

== Awards ==
- 2005: Dayton, Ohio Broadcasters Hall of Fame inductee
