= WDRK =

WDRK could refer to:

- WGNW, a radio station (99.9 FM) licensed to Cornell, Wisconsin, United States, which held the call sign WDRK from 2001 to 2020
- WDRK (defunct), a defunct radio station (106.5 FM) in Greenville, Ohio, United States
