= WDSJ =

WDSJ may refer to:

- WDSJ-LP, a low-power radio station (106.1 FM) licensed to serve Ooltewah, Tennessee, United States
- WTKD (FM), a radio station (106.5 FM) licensed to serve Greenville, Ohio, United States, which held the call sign WDSJ from 2004 to 2014
