= WTKD =

WTKD may refer to:

- WTKD (FM), a radio station (106.5 FM) licensed to serve Greenville, Ohio, United States
- WABF (AM), a radio station (1480 AM) licensed to serve Mobile, Alabama, United States, which held the call sign WTKD from 2012 to 2014
