= WGNZ =

Fairborn, Ohio; United States
- Broadcast area: Dayton metropolitan area
- Frequency: 1110 kHz

Programming
- Format: Christian talk and teaching - Southern Gospel music

Ownership
- Owner: L&D Broadcasters Inc.

History
- First air date: October 26, 1968 (as WELX)
- Former call signs: WELX (1968–1984); WMMX (1984–1993)
- Call sign meaning: Good Newz 1110

Technical information
- Licensing authority: FCC
- Facility ID: 36075
- Class: D
- Power: 5,000 watts day 1,700 watts critical hours 2 watts night
- Transmitter coordinates: 39°39′53″N 83°56′38″W
- Translator: 104.3 W282CD (Dayton, Ohio)

Links
- Public license information: Public file; LMS
- Website: www.wgnz.com

WGNZ (1110 kHz "Good News 1110") is a commercial AM radio station licensed to Fairborn, Ohio, with radio studios in Dayton and its transmitter in Xenia (the original city of license). It airs a Christian talk and teaching radio format with Southern Gospel music. The owner is L&D Broadcasters Inc.

By day, WGNZ transmits with 5,000 watts. Because 1110 AM is a clear channel frequency reserved for Class A WBT Charlotte and KFAB Omaha, WGNZ must reduce power to 1,700 watts during critical hours and to only 2 watts night. WGNZ is heard around the clock on FM translator W282CD on 104.3 MHz in Dayton.

== History ==
WGNZ was founded in 1968 as 250-watt daytimer using the call sign WELX. It was owned by West Central Ohio Broadcasters Inc., and it was the AM sister station of WHBM (now WZDA). The WELX call letters stood for: Ernie and Lowell, along with the city of Xenia. Ernie and Lowell were the sons of founders Harry and Ernestine Miller.

The station was sold in 1979 to L&D Broadcasters Inc. and returned to the air in 1980 airing Urban Gospel music in the morning and early evenings and Southern Gospel in the afternoons.

Rev. Norman Livingston of Dayton, a local independent church pastor who also promoted Southern Gospel Music concerts, began to work with WELX and became the afternoon co-host. He eventually moved into managing and promoting the station in 1981 when urban gospel music was dropped in favor of full-time southern gospel music. In 1984, the station switched the call sign from WELX to WMMX to stand for "Message Music Radio" or "Gospel Music's Best MIX."

Eventually that call sign was replaced with WGNZ and its new slogan "Good News 1110". The released call sign "WMMX" was taken by 107.7 FM. As of November 1, 2008, the old tower site has been razed. In the Summer of 2008, WGNZ built a new state of the art transmitter and tower facility.

== Programming ==
WGNZ is one of the last locally owned commercial stations in the Dayton, Ohio market. The station features National and Local pastors providing Christian talk and teaching programs. It is also the only radio station in the Miami Valley that is primarily Southern Gospel, but also features Bluegrass and Local Artists. WGNZ has streamed its programming on the internet since July 9, 1996. WGNZ was at that time the second Christian radio station in Ohio to stream on the internet.

The WELX callsign is now used at an FM station in Isabella, Puerto Rico.
