= WCWB =

- Marathon, Wisconsin; United States
- Broadcast area: Wausau-Stevens Point area
- Frequency: 104.9 MHz
- Branding: B104.9

Programming
- Format: Country music

Ownership
- Owner: Richard L. Muzzy; (Muzzy Broadcast Group, LLC)
- Sister stations: WPCN, WSPT

History
- Former call signs: WIGL (1987); WMGU (1987–1996); WKQH (1996–2017)
- Call sign meaning: W-Country & Western Bee (branding and logo mascot)

Technical information
- Licensing authority: FCC
- Facility ID: 2109
- Class: C3
- ERP: 21,000 watts
- HAAT: 109.0 meters
- Transmitter coordinates: 44°50′13.00″N 89°45′57.00″W

Links
- Public license information: Public file; LMS
- Website: b1049.com

WCWB (104.9 FM) is a radio station broadcasting a Classic Country music format. Licensed to Marathon, Wisconsin, United States, the station serves the Wausau-Stevens Point area.

== Format history ==
During most of the '90s, the station carried a variation of Classic rock under names such as "104.9 KQH" and "104.9 K-ROCK". In 2003, the station flipped to Active Rock as "Rock 104-9". The ratings initially were good, however this did not last and the station switched to its current format.

== History ==
The stations' original calls were WIGL. In 1988, the station changed its call sign to WMGU, with an Adult Contemporary format, as "Magic 105" using a format from syndicator Drake-Chenault, and later using a satellite format from Jones Radio. The station went dark in late 1991, and was later purchased by Americus Communications, headed by Rick Muzzy, initially simulcasting WSPO and its talk format. On February 1, 1996, the call letters switched to WKQH. On August 1, 2017, the calls were changed to WCWB to reflect its B-104.9 Moniker.

Logo under previous slogan
