= WZDA =

Radio station in Beavercreek, Ohio

- Beavercreek, Ohio; United States
- Broadcast area: Dayton metro area
- Frequency: 103.9 MHz (HD Radio)
- Branding: New Country 103-9

Programming
- Format: Country music
- Subchannels: HD2: Rock variety hits
- Affiliations: Premiere Networks

Ownership
- Owner: iHeartMedia, Inc.; (iHM Licenses, LLC)
- Sister stations: WCHD, WIZE, WMMX, WONE, WTUE

History
- First air date: June 18, 1962
- Former call signs: WHBM (1962–1978); WDJX (1978–1981); WDJX-FM (1981–1983); WYMJ-FM (1983–1994); WRVF (1994–1995); WXEG (1995–2015)

Technical information
- Licensing authority: FCC
- Facility ID: 67689
- Class: A
- ERP: 2,900 watts
- HAAT: 146 meters (479 ft)
- Transmitter coordinates: 39°43′19.00″N 84°12′33.00″W

Links
- Public license information: Public file; LMS
- Webcast: Listen live (via iHeartRadio); Listen live (HD2)
- Website: newcountry1039fm.iheart.com

WZDA (103.9 FM) is a commercial radio station licensed to Beavercreek, Ohio, serving the Dayton metro area. Owned by iHeartMedia, Inc., it broadcasts country music, with studios in Dayton and transmitter in Moraine. Besides a standard analog transmission, WZDA broadcasts in HD Radio and is available online via iHeartRadio.

== History ==
=== WHBM (1962–1978) ===
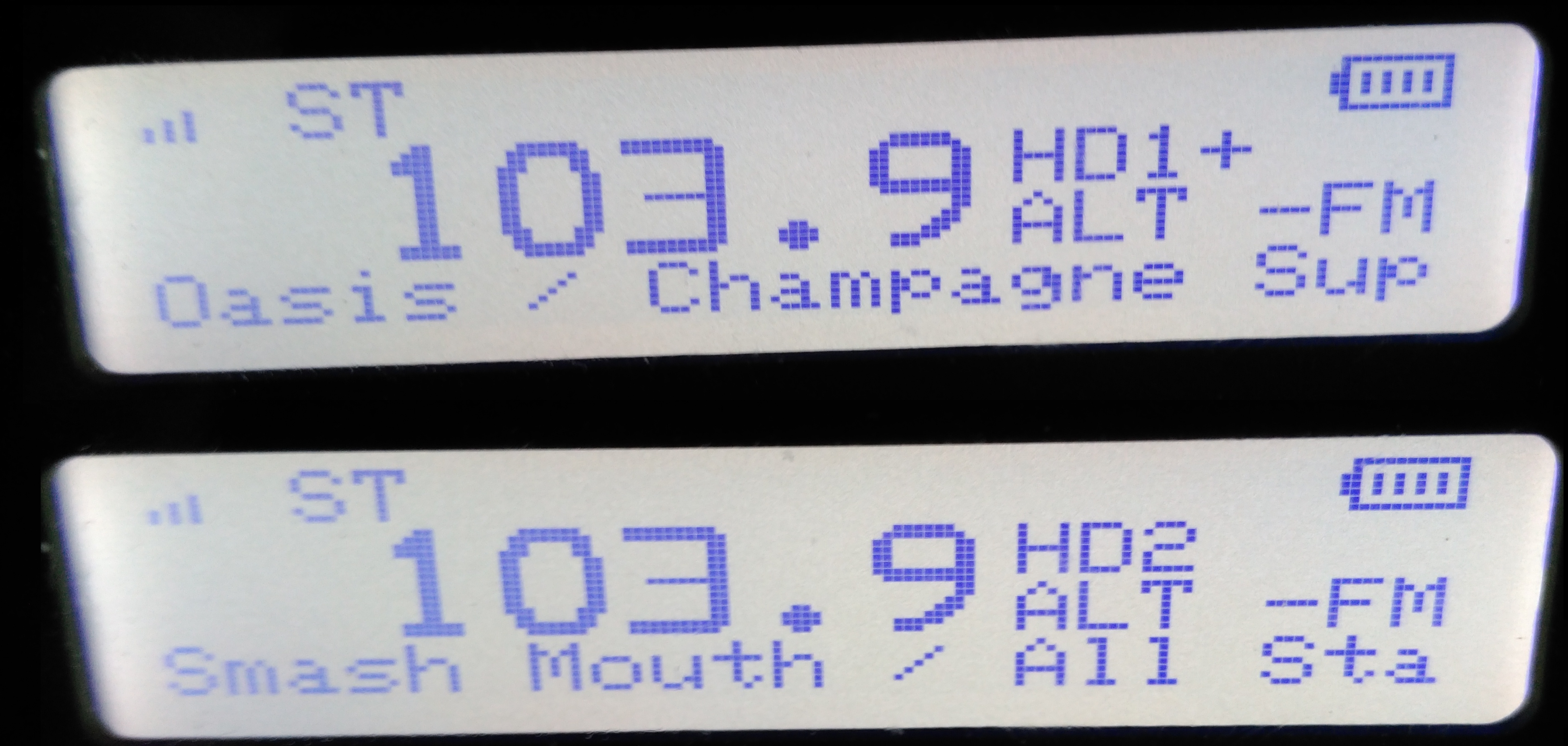
WZDA's HD Radio Channels on a SPARC Radio with PSD.

WZDA began as WHBM on June 18, 1962, under license to Xenia, Ohio; the WHBM call letters stood for "Harry B. Miller", the station's owner and general manager. WHBM was the FM sister station to AM station WELX in Xenia and WERM in Wapakoneta. WELX and WHBM began operations in the late 1960s with a middle of the road format, then switching in the early 1970s to progressive jazz and soul gospel. WHBM_FM, began operations first in 1962 from the second floor above "The Dutch Oven" bakery on North Detroit St., in Xenia. WELX began operations several years later. Both stations eventually operated from the WELX transmitter site adjacent to U.S. Route 35 off June Drive in Xenia. Both stations miraculously survived the April 3, 1974, tornado which ravaged Xenia and nearby Beavercreek. However, a fire destroyed the small studio/transmitter building around 1977, thus WELX and WHBM both went silent.

=== WDJX (1978–1982) ===
Both stations along with WERM were sold in 1978 to separate owners with WELX (now southern gospel WGNZ) owned by L&D Broadcasting and WHBM sold to Ohio Broadcast Associates becoming Top-40 formatted WDJX, using the "Xenia/Fairborn/Beavercreek" top of hour ID giving FM competition to Dayton's WING (AM).

=== WYMJ (1982–1992) ===
In 1982 WDJX moved its studios (and eventually its city of license) to Beavercreek, later becoming Hot A/C-formatted "Majic 104" WYMJ-FM. In 1989 WYMJ was purchased by Alan Gray's Dayton Radio, Inc and switched to "Oldies 104".

=== WRVF (1992–1995) ===
By 1992, the station became WRVF "The River" with a country format before being overshadowed by the former WHIO-FM becoming WHKO "K-99.1 FM",.

=== WXEG (1995–2015) ===
In late August 1995, the station became "103.9 The Edge", WXEG introducing the Alternative format to Dayton and moving the studios to Dayton's Historic Oregon District. During this time, WXEG with sister stations WONE (AM) and WTUE (FM) went through several ownerships after being sold by Group One to Stoner Broadcasting, American Radio Systems, Entercom and finally Jacor before its merger with Clear Channel.

logo as X103.9

On January 1, 1998, "103.9 The Edge" became "103.9 The X", retaining the Alternative format but rebranding due to a dispute with a consultant who owned the trademark of "The Edge."

By 2010, WXEG changed formats to active rock as it was moved to the Mediabase active rock panel, but by 2015, it returned to the Alternative panel after phasing out the harder rock product.

=== WZDA (2015–present) ===
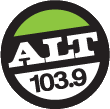
Logo as "Alt" (2015–2021)

On August 28, 2015, WXEG completed the move back to alternative rock, rebranding as "Alt 103-9". The station changed its call sign to the current WZDA on September 28, 2015.

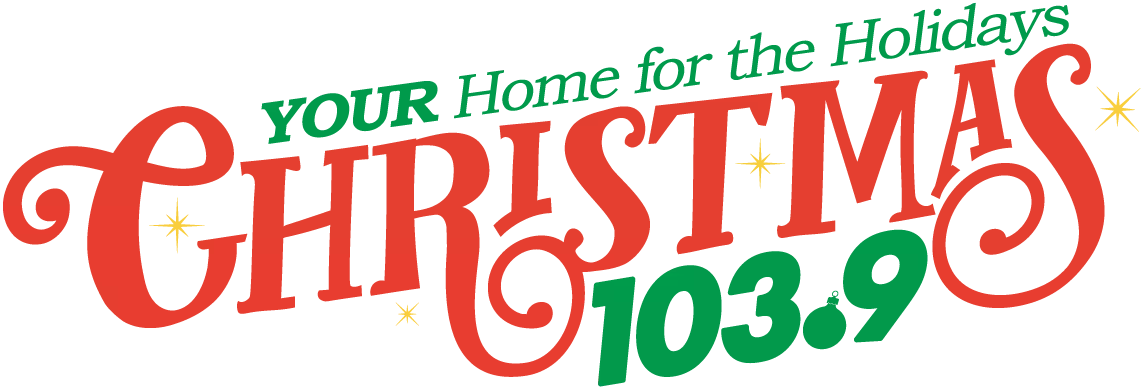
"Christmas 103.9" logo

Short-lived logo of "The Bull" (2021-22)

On November 24, 2021, at 6 a.m., after playing a block of "goodbye"-themed songs (specifically "In The End" by Linkin Park, "Closing Time" by Semisonic, and "It's the End of the World as We Know It (And I Feel Fine)" by R.E.M.), WZDA dropped their rock format after 26 years and began stunting with Christmas music as "Christmas 103.9"; a new format is expected after the holidays. The first song on "Christmas" was Frank Sinatra's cover of "Jingle Bells". WZDA replaces former sister WRZX-FM as iHeart's Christmas music brand in the Dayton market, as WRZX-FM was donated from iHeart’s Aloha Stations Trust along with WYDB and flipped to conservative talk in August. The change comes as the now-former "Alt" format had a 2.0 share in the October 2021 Nielsen Audio ratings. On December 27, 2021, at Midnight, WZDA flipped to country as "103.9 The Bull", with the first song being "Buy Dirt" by Jordan Davis and Luke Bryan. On January 14, 2022, WZDA rebranded as "New Country 103.9".

== WZDA in HD ==
The station started broadcasting in HD Radio on February 2, 2006.

- HD1 is a simulcast of its analog audio and
- HD2 broadcasts a rock format as "iHeart's Rock Drive". The station broadcasts using the MP1 service mode.

== Concerts ==
WXEG held an annual X-Fest every year from 1996 to 2012. The X-Fest was cancelled in 2012 just weeks before the event was to take place and has not taken place since.
