= Mike McConnell (radio personality) =

American radio host

Mike McConnell is an American talk radio host most recently on WLW in Cincinnati from 2014 through 2025, on WGN in Chicago from 2010 to 2013 and for the prior 25 years on WLW.

== Early career ==
McConnell started out in radio as Alan McConnell, as a rock music DJ at an album-oriented college radio station WVUD (University of Dayton) in Dayton, Ohio in the 1970s. After five years at the University Of Dayton, McConnell left for crosstown Album Rock WTUE in Dayton, where he used the name Mike McConnell due to Alan Sells already being "Alan" on WTUE. In the spring of 1982, McConnell moved to Cincinnati, Ohio to flip formats on KISS 96 in Cincinnati from top 40 to rock, where he remained until late 1983.

== WLW ==
After a short time with WSHE in Miami, McConnell returned to Cincinnati, where he filled in for Randy Michaels' mid-day talk show on 700 WLW, before Michaels handed the talk show off to McConnell so Michaels could take on a larger role in management.

On WLW, McConnell previously hosted two programs. His weekday show aired Monday through Friday from 10 a.m. to 2 p.m. (ET) on WLW in Cincinnati and formerly nationwide on XM Satellite Radio (discontinued by Clear Channel in March 2009). In the late '90s, McConnell's show began airing at 9 a.m., taking one hour from WLW radio morning personality Jim Scott's previously five-hour time slot. Bill Cunningham, the longtime evening personality at the station, switched to afternoons around this same time period, hosting from noon to 3 p.m. and in direct market competition with Rush Limbaugh whose syndicated program aired on another station in Cincinnati, WKRC. "Midday with Mike", as it was now called, formerly known as The Mike McConnell Show, aired from 9 a.m. to noon on WLW and it was picked up for national syndication by Premiere Radio Networks in July 2006 (replacing the then retiring Phil Hendrie, who returned to radio in 2007), and at its peak, aired on roughly 20 stations across America, including WIBC in Indianapolis, WGST in Atlanta and WSYR in Syracuse. However, the show failed to acquire a nationwide audience, and a dwindling affiliate count resulted in Premiere quietly canceling the show's syndicated run in February, 2008.

McConnell's Saturday show, The Weekend with Mike McConnell, was heard Saturdays from noon to 3 p.m. (ET) on over 100 stations. The Weekend was developed in 1998 to feature rotating guest hosts. McConnell took over the show permanently in 2004.

== WGN ==
It was announced on June 7, 2010, that McConnell was no longer working at WLW-AM and was leaving Cincinnati to become a host for WGN in Chicago. His show originally ran from 8:30 a.m. (CT) to 12:30 p.m. As of December 12, 2011, it was changed to 9 a.m. to noon. In August 2013, McConnell was no longer on the air after a management change at Tribune Broadcasting. His show was available via podcast only until October, when it ended and he reportedly reached a buyout settlement on the remaining two years of his contract.

== Return to WLW ==
McConnell guest hosted several shows on WLW during the week of June 16 to June 20, 2014. As of late 2014, McConnell is back on the full-time schedule for WLW. He currently hosts the 5:00 a.m. – 9:00 a.m. morning slot. McConnell had held the midday time slot prior to leaving WLW for WGN.

== Views and style ==
McConnell's shows often feature a broad range of topics, from "in the news" social issues to the oddities of everyday life. McConnell describes himself as politically and socially moderate on most issues, and has identified himself as one that has libertarian leanings. Moreso than such hosts as the late Rush Limbaugh or Sean Hannity, he can be dismissive of conservative callers who agree with him but make statements that he finds exaggerated or poorly reasoned. McConnell has taken a libertarian position on various issues including his opposition to the drug war and specifically on marijuana being illegal.

== Personal life ==
McConnell grew up in the Philadelphia area and attended the University of Dayton. He has an adult daughter with his former wife, Cincinnati radio personality Mary Kuzan.

== Retirement ==
On Friday March 28, 2025 it was formally announced by Mike on air (700 WLW) that he would be retiring, with the last show being Friday April 4, 2025. Thom Brennaman will take over as morning host on Monday, April 7, 2025.
