= WIZE =

Radio station in Springfield, Ohio

- Springfield, Ohio; United States
- Broadcast area: Dayton metropolitan area
- Frequency: 1340 kHz
- Branding: Dayton's BIN 1340

Programming
- Format: All-news radio
- Network: Black Information Network
- Affiliations: Cavaliers AudioVerse

Ownership
- Owner: iHeartMedia, Inc.; (iHM Licenses, LLC)
- Sister stations: WCHD; WMMX; WONE; WTUE; WZDA

History
- First air date: November 1, 1940
- Call sign meaning: Pronounced "wise"

Technical information
- Licensing authority: FCC
- Facility ID: 62208
- Class: C
- Power: 1,000 watts
- Transmitter coordinates: 39°56′33″N 83°47′15″W
- Repeater: 99.9 WCHD-HD2 (Kettering)

Links
- Public license information: Public file; LMS
- Webcast: Listen live (via iHeartRadio)
- Website: dayton.binnews.com

WIZE (1340 AM, "Dayton's BIN 1340") is a commercial radio station licensed to Springfield, Ohio, United States, and serving the Dayton metropolitan area. Owned by iHeartMedia, Inc., the station carries an all-news radio format as an affiliate for the Black Information Network, with studios in Dayton and transmitter in Springfield. In addition to a standard analog transmission, WIZE streams via iHeartRadio.

== History ==
The station took the air on November 1, 1940, and was very active in the community. Its founder and first owner was The Radio Voice of Springfield Inc.

In the station's early days, nationally known comedian Jonathan Winters had a program on WIZE. However, in the mid-1960s, WIZE adopted a Top 40 format, increasing its popularity and revenue. Under the leadership of station manager Steve Joos, listenership (and advertising revenues) grew to the point that WIZE was the most profitable station in the Great Trails Broadcasting chain. WING in Dayton, WCOL in Columbus and WGTZ in Eaton (formerly WJAI) were also owned by Great Trails.

The station was moved from its downtown location on West High Street to a location on Miracle Mile. In order to comply with zoning regulations, the building had to be set back from the road and had to look like a residence. As a result, WIZE's studios had a country setting while remaining in the city. Among the list of past employees include Jim Baldridge, Duke Rollins, Sonny Palmer, Paul Carman, Ron Allen, the late John Hall, Johnny Walker, Lee Brenner, Ric Jonns, Fred "Buddy" King, John King, Geoff Davis, Jerry "T" Tritle, and Pat Barry. WIZE was also the home to news and sports director Gerry Allen and notable news reporters Karen Anderson and Darryl Bauer. Will Harris also worked with Gerry Allen on high school and Wittenberg sports broadcasts in the 1970s.

In 1982, Joos left WIZE to accept a position in Columbus. He was replaced as general manager by Joe Taylor who instituted numerous changes in the station. He brought in two new staff members (Sandy Alexander and Dennis Carter) and changed the format to a middle-of-the-road type format. Taylor instituted an all-out sales push, selling commercials for as little as a dollar. As a result, the station was oversold, often running as much as 40 minutes of commercial material each hour.

Taylor only lasted a few years as general manager, and was replaced by George Wymer with the intention of purchasing the station from Great Trails. He was unable to make the purchase and left the station.

The next general manager was Jerry Staggs, who eventually did purchase the station. Under Staggs' watch, WIZE associated with the former WBLY, the predecessor of WULM as part of a local marketing agreement with owner RAY Broadcasting. By this time, both stations operated in the same building. Staggs sold the station in the 1990s to WONE's then-owner, Jacor using the name Citicasters, which dropped all local programming for a simulcast of WONE, effectively ending any and all relationship with Springfield.

After a stint as a country music station, WONE/WIZE changed to adult standards on November 29, 1994. It adopted a sports talk format (as "Sports ONE") on December 8, 2003, competing with Radio One-owned WING. This eventually became a near-total simulcast of then "1360 Homer" in Cincinnati. This simulcast of nationally syndicated programming was further diluted in 2007, when WONE/WIZE would start to air local sports talk in the afternoon, as well as clearing Fox Sports Radio in the morning hours.

WIZE continued to relay WONE until April 22, 2011, when it broke away to carry a country oldies music format. WULM's usage of the former WIZE studios at the WIZE transmitter site ended in June 2010. As a result, the WIZE studio building now only houses transmitting and remote broadcasting equipment as WIZE programming is fed from Dayton.

WIZE dropped the classic country format to carry iHeartMedia's Black Information Network, branded as "Dayton's BIN 1340", on July 27, 2020.
