= WTUE =

- Dayton, Ohio; United States
- Broadcast area: Dayton metropolitan area
- Frequency: 104.7 MHz (HD Radio)
- Branding: 104.7 WTUE

Programming
- Format: Classic rock
- Subchannels: HD2: Sports (WONE simulcast)
- Affiliations: Westwood One; Cincinnati Bengals Radio Network

Ownership
- Owner: iHeartMedia; (iHM Licenses, LLC)
- Sister stations: WCHD, WIZE, WMMX, WONE, WZDA

History
- First air date: May 29, 1960
- Former call signs: WIFE (1960–1961); WONE-FM (1961–1971)
- Call sign meaning: pronounced as "two", complementing WONE

Technical information
- Licensing authority: FCC
- Facility ID: 1909
- Class: B
- ERP: 28,000 watts
- HAAT: 200 meters (660 ft)
- Transmitter coordinates: 39.722°N 84.210°W

Links
- Public license information: Public file; LMS
- Webcast: Listen live (via iHeartRadio)
- Website: wtue.iheart.com

WTUE (104.7 FM) is a classic rock formatted radio station in Dayton, Ohio. The station is owned and operated by iHeartMedia. Its transmitter is located in Moraine.

== History ==
=== Top 40 (1960–1967) ===
The station signed on the air on May 29, 1960, as the 3rd FM station in Dayton. Briefly known as WIFE, WTUE's beginnings was that of WONE-FM simulcasting sister station WONE which had a Top 40 format until 1967.

=== Country (1969–1974) ===
In 1969, WONE switched to country. In 1971, the FCC granted permission to boost its power to 50,000 watts and monaural WONE-FM transformed to FM-stereo, and briefly quadraphonic, "the all new W-2" under the programming of Bill Struck, followed by Gregg Mason (Terry Dorsey).

=== Top 40 (1974–1976) ===
In 1974, WTUE was "The Super Ten Four!" with morning personality Gregg Mason, Sean McKay in the midday slot, Al Morgan in early afternoons, Bill Lyons in afternoon drive, and Dave Michaels in the evening.

=== Rock (1976–present) ===
In 1976, the station switched to the new and innovative album oriented rock (AOR) format under the direction of Dave Michaels as program director. Gregg Mason was moved to sister station WONE. Patty Spitler, who had been the morning host at the University of Dayton's WVUD, (considered "underground rock" at the time) would become "T-105"'s first morning show host. Dave Michaels (Dave Ingersoll) left WTUE and was replaced by Chuck Browning as program director from WWWM in Cleveland. Browning also held a 4-hour midday air shift.

Sean Scott (Sean Scott Sizemore) was the first AOR announcer hired from North Carolina by WTUE to replace Al Morgan in the afternoon drive slot. Scott was also WTUE's first music director. This was the beginning of the transformation from WTUE, the rock station staffed by Top-40 announcers, to a station who staffed themselves by hiring graduates of the University of Dayton's radio station, WVUD. Patty Spitler, Bob Clark, Jim Tobin, Dan Pugh (Dan Patrick), Bill Pugh, Dave Luczak, Kevin Crisler (K.C), Mark Zona (Mark Edwards), Sandy Smith and Alan McConnell were all graduates (or at least attended) The University of Dayton and were all part of their radio program. McConnell, whose name was changed to Mike McConnell because Alan Sells was a part time announcer and the station thought one Alan was enough. Alan Sells, who was hired as a part timer while at suburban Stebbins High School in 1974 was given his first full-time slot holding down the evening timeslot in 1976 until his departure for Cincinnati's WSAI-FM in 1979. Sells is now Big Al of Big Al and Charlie at KFRQ in McAllen, Texas.

Early 1979 was a transitional point for WTUE. Patty Spitler left the station. Sue Arenston joined the station from Cincinnati and Sean "The Space Cowboy" Scott was moved to the morning slot. Alan McConnell who came to WTUE as a fill in jock was given the afternoon drive slot. Scott would soon leave WTUE for WMAD in Madison, Wisconsin, to pursue his desire to program his own radio station. After several years in Madison, Sean Scott left Madison and radio. Mike McConnell would soon become the program director at WTUE to replace Chuck Browning who left the airwaves to take a larger management role at 11 South Wilkinson, where the station had been located. McConnell would go on to program WSKS in Hamilton in May 1982 before moving to WLW in Cincinnati a little over a year later. McConnell remained at WLW until 2010 when it was announced he would be moving to Chicago to become a host for WGN. In 2013 McConnell left WGN. In 2014, he returned to WLW where he currently is the morning show host.

Sports personality and University of Dayton graduate Dan Patrick was half of the morning team on WTUE in the late-1970s/early-1980s under his given name, Dan Pugh. Dan was partnered as morning host with several other DJs over the years including Sean Scott, Dave Luczak, Major Dick Hale and Jeff Curry. WTUE was awarded Billboard's coveted "Station Of The Year" in the album-oriented rock format for medium-sized markets in 1983 under program director Bill Pugh (Dan Pugh's brother) and again in 1985 under Tom Carroll who served as program director from 1984 to 1997.

From 1986 to 1999, WTUE was home to the highly rated Kerrigan & Christopher morning show. Christopher (Geisen) left the station in 1999 but returned in 2016, and (Steve) Kerrigan left WTUE's airwaves in 2003. Steve Kerrigan died of multiple myeloma in March 2011. He was inducted into the Dayton Broadcasters Hall of Fame in 2011. Christopher Geisen was inducted in 2017, and John "B-Man" Beaulieu was inducted in 2013. Former PD Tom Carroll was also inducted in 2019.

Station ownership has included Group One Broadcasting (Akron), DKM Broadcasting, Summit Communications, Stoner Broadcasting, American Radio Systems, Inc., Jacor Communications and Citicasters Co., a subsidiary of Clear Channel Communications (now iHeartMedia).

== HD radio ==
In March 2007, WTUE began broadcasts in HD Radio by simulcasting its analog audio on its HD1 stream and broadcasting a more album-oriented rock format on its HD2 stream. The station broadcasts using the MP1 service mode.
