= WHIO-FM =

News/talk radio station in Pleasant Hill–Dayton, Ohio

Simulcast of WHIO, Dayton
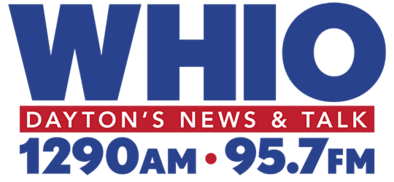
- Pleasant Hill, Ohio; United States
- Broadcast area: Dayton metropolitan area
- Frequency: 95.7 MHz
- Branding: AM 1290 and News 95.7 WHIO

Programming
- Format: Talk radio
- Affiliations: Fox News Radio; Compass Media Networks; Premiere Networks; Dayton Flyers; Cleveland Browns Radio Network

Ownership
- Owner: Cox Media Group; (CMG Radio Operating Company, LLC)
- Sister stations: WHIO; WHIO-TV; WHKO; WZLR

History
- First air date: November 30, 1960
- Former call signs: WPTW-FM (1960–89); WCLR (1989–2000); WDPT (2000–06)
- Call sign meaning: "Ohio"

Technical information
- Licensing authority: FCC
- Facility ID: 73908
- Class: B
- ERP: 50,000 watts
- HAAT: 145 meters (476 ft)
- Transmitter coordinates: 40°13′3.20″N 84°17′36.80″W

Links
- Public license information: Public file; LMS
- Webcast: Listen live; Listen live (via Audacy)
- Website: www.whio.com

WHIO-FM (95.7 MHz) is a commercial radio station licensed to Pleasant Hill, Ohio, United States, and serving the Dayton metropolitan area. Owned by Cox Media Group, it features a talk radio format in a simulcast with WHIO (1290 AM). The studios are located at the Cox Media Center on South Main Street (Ohio State Route 48) in Dayton.

The transmitter tower is on Aiken Road in Houston.

== History ==
The station signed on the air on November 30, 1960 as WPTW-FM. Its original city of license was Piqua, and it largely simulcast co-owned WPTW (1570 AM). WPTW originally operated as a daytime-only station. So after sunset, listeners could continue to hear the station by tuning in WPTW-FM.

By the late 1960s, WPTW played middle of the road (MOR) music using a sophisticated reel-to-reel automation system, while the FM had a beautiful music format, playing 15 minute sweeps of instrumental cover versions of popular songs, at first with no vocals. The exception was the "Dell-O Morning Show" hosted by Dell Olmay, which was heard on both stations. WPTW-FM's station identification remained until 1974 as: "This is WPTW...FM Stereo...transmitting from Piqua, Ohio." It began using both Piqua and Troy in its legal I.D. in 1975.

After Federal Communications Commission (FCC) rules changed regarding daytimer AM stations operating on Mexican clear channel frequencies, 1570 WPTW was finally given approval by the FCC in 1986 to broadcast around the clock. That led WPTW-FM to end all simulcasting. WPTW-FM could carry a separate format and image, including a change in its call sign.

After the original WHIO-FM 99.1 flipped to country music from easy listening in 1989, WPTW-FM management wanted to quickly fill the hole. The station continued its own easy format, but changed its call letters to WCLR with the moniker "Clear 95". Later that year, in an effort to attract younger listeners, WCLR began adding more vocals to its easy format. WCLR made a full switch to soft adult contemporary a short time later, still under the "Clear 95" name with the "Lite and Easy Favorites" slogan.

In early 1993, WCLR switched to an oldies format playing the hits of the 1950s through the early 1970s as "Kool 95". Later that year, it purchased WDJK in nearby Xenia. It flipped that station's callsign to WZLR and began simulcasting the oldies format on both 95.3 and 95.7. In mid-1997, after the stations were purchased by the Cox Media Group, the moniker was changed to "Oldies 95", keeping the same format.

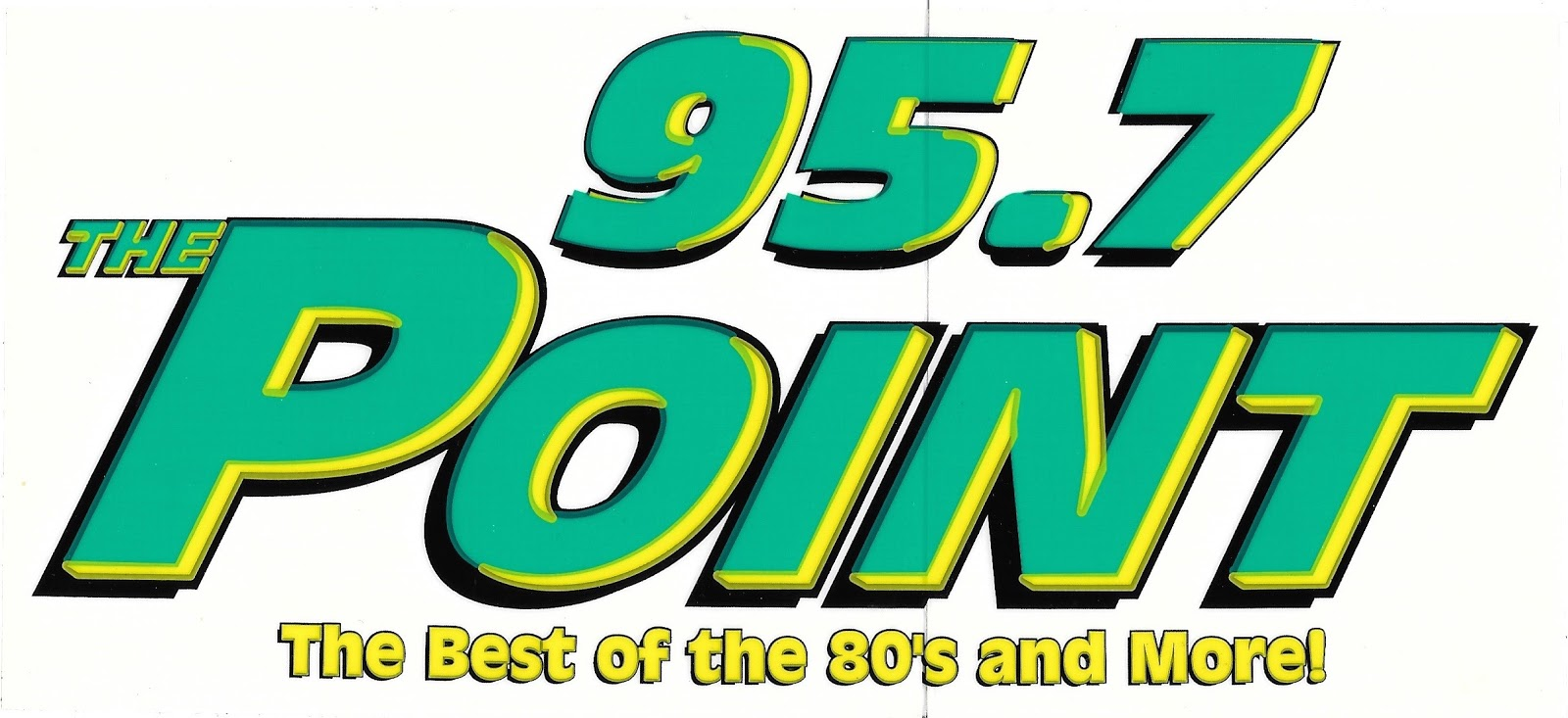
Former WDPT 95.7 The Point logo

In 2000, the station switched from oldies to classic hits, covering the top songs from the late 1970s through the 1980s. It changed its call letters to WDPT and switched its moniker to "The Point". It only continued the simulcast with 95.3 for a short time, before the Xenia station flipped to classic rock as "The Eagle". "The Point", and its mostly 1980s format, was consulted by Randy Kabrich, who had programmed WRBQ-FM in Tampa in the mid-to-late 1980s.

In October 2006, after playing "Don't You (Forget About Me)" by Simple Minds, WDPT's music format ended. The station switched to news and talk. It began a simulcast of 1290 WHIO, using the call sign WHIO-FM.

In July 2011, the station changed its community of license from Piqua to Pleasant Hill, Ohio, even though the transmitter did not move. This change was reportedly necessitated by FCC requirements that the station's main studio be located within 25 miles of its community of license. With the move of Cox Media Group facilities to the South Main Street location, Piqua no longer met that requirement, but Pleasant Hill does. That rule was eliminated by the FCC in October 2017.

== Programming ==
Weekdays on WHIO-AM-FM begin with The Miami Valley's Morning News anchored by Larry Hansgen, Brittany Otto, and Jeremy Ratliff. In PM drive time, a local talk program is heard, The Evening Edge with Todd Hollst. The rest of the day features nationally syndicated talk programs: Brian Kilmeade and Friends, The Erick Erickson Show, The Sean Hannity Show, Fox Across America with Jimmy Failla and Coast to Coast AM with George Noory. Weekends feature specialty shows on money, health, cars and gardening as well as repeats of weekday programs. Most hours begin with an update from CBS News Radio.

WHIO-AM-FM serve as the flagship stations for University of Dayton Flyers football and basketball. WHIO also serves as the Dayton home for Cleveland Browns play-by-play football during the NFL season.
