= WSPT =

- Stevens Point, Wisconsin; United States
- Broadcast area: Stevens Point-Wisconsin Rapids
- Frequency: 97.9 MHz
- Branding: 97.9 WSPT

Programming
- Format: Classic hits
- Affiliations: ABC News Radio; United Stations Radio Networks

Ownership
- Owner: Richard L. Muzzy; (Muzzy Broadcast Group, LLC)
- Sister stations: WCWB, WPCN

History
- First air date: May 1, 1961
- Former call signs: WSPT-FM (1961–1977, 1996–2012); WSPT (1977–1996)
- Call sign meaning: Stevens Point

Technical information
- Licensing authority: FCC
- Facility ID: 2104
- Class: C1
- ERP: 100,000 watts
- HAAT: 103 meters (338 ft)
- Transmitter coordinates: 44°32′17.00″N 89°35′43.00″W

Links
- Public license information: Public file; LMS
- Webcast: Listen live
- Website: 979wspt.com

WSPT (97.9 FM) is a commercial radio station licensed to Stevens Point, Wisconsin, United States, and serves the Stevens Point-Wisconsin Rapids area. The station is owned by Richard L. Muzzy, through licensee Muzzy Broadcast Group, LLC and broadcasts a classic hits format.

== History ==
The station first signed on May 1, 1961, as WSPT-FM. Throughout the 1960s and 1970s, it was a dominant top 40 station in the Wausau-Stevens Point market, originally simulcasting its AM sister station WSPT (1010 AM). In April 1968, Peter A. Bernard sold WSPT-AM-FM to Sentry Corp., a subsidiary of Stevens Point-based Sentry Insurance, for $465,000. The simulcast ended in late 1977 when WSPT (AM) flipped to country music as WXYQ; the FM outlet retained the top 40 format and adjusted its call sign to WSPT. Through the early 1990s, WSPT's ratings were second only to Wausau-based rival WIFC.

In October 1993, the station switched to an adult contemporary (AC) format, branding itself as "Sunny 98". By the middle of the decade, this was adjusted to a modern AC presentation as "Today's Music Revolution, 98 WSPT"; in 1996, the station changed its call sign back to WSPT-FM. In the 2000s, WSPT-FM segued to hot AC as "97.9 WSPT". In 2005, the station flipped to ABC Radio's fledging syndicated adult hits format, "Jack FM", reverting to the "97.9 WSPT" branding when it flipped to oldies featuring programming from The True Oldies Channel. In 2012, the station dropped the -FM suffix to become simply WSPT. Later, On June 30, 2014, WSPT segued to a classic hits format.

Syndicated programming on WSPT includes America's Greatest Hits, a weekly show hosted by Scott Shannon.
