= WMMX =

Radio station in Dayton, Ohio

- Dayton, Ohio; United States
- Broadcast area: Dayton metropolitan area
- Frequency: 107.7 MHz (HD Radio)
- Branding: MIX 107.7

Programming
- Format: Hot adult contemporary
- Affiliations: Premiere Networks

Ownership
- Owner: iHeartMedia, Inc.; (iHM Licenses, LLC)
- Sister stations: WCHD, WIZE, WONE, WTUE, WZDA

History
- First air date: September 1, 1964
- Former call signs: WDAO-FM (1964–1985); WWSN (1985–1991)
- Call sign meaning: Miami Valley's MiX 107.7

Technical information
- Licensing authority: FCC
- Facility ID: 1904
- Class: B
- ERP: 28,000 watts
- HAAT: 200 meters (660 ft)
- Transmitter coordinates: 39°43′19″N 84°12′36″W

Links
- Public license information: Public file; LMS
- Webcast: Listen live (via iHeartRadio)
- Website: mix1077.iheart.com

WMMX (107.7 FM "Mix 107.7") is a commercial radio station broadcasting a hot adult contemporary format. It is licensed to Dayton, Ohio, and is owned by iHeartMedia with the license held by as iHM Licenses, LLC. Weeknights, it carries the nationally syndicated show On with Mario Lopez. Its studios and offices are on South Main Street in Dayton.

WMMX has an effective radiated power (ERP) of 28,000 watts. The transmitter is on Sandridge Drive, near Interstate 75 in Dayton. WMMX broadcasts using HD Radio technology. The HD-2 digital subchannel formerly carried Classic American Top 40 with Casey Kasem.

== History ==
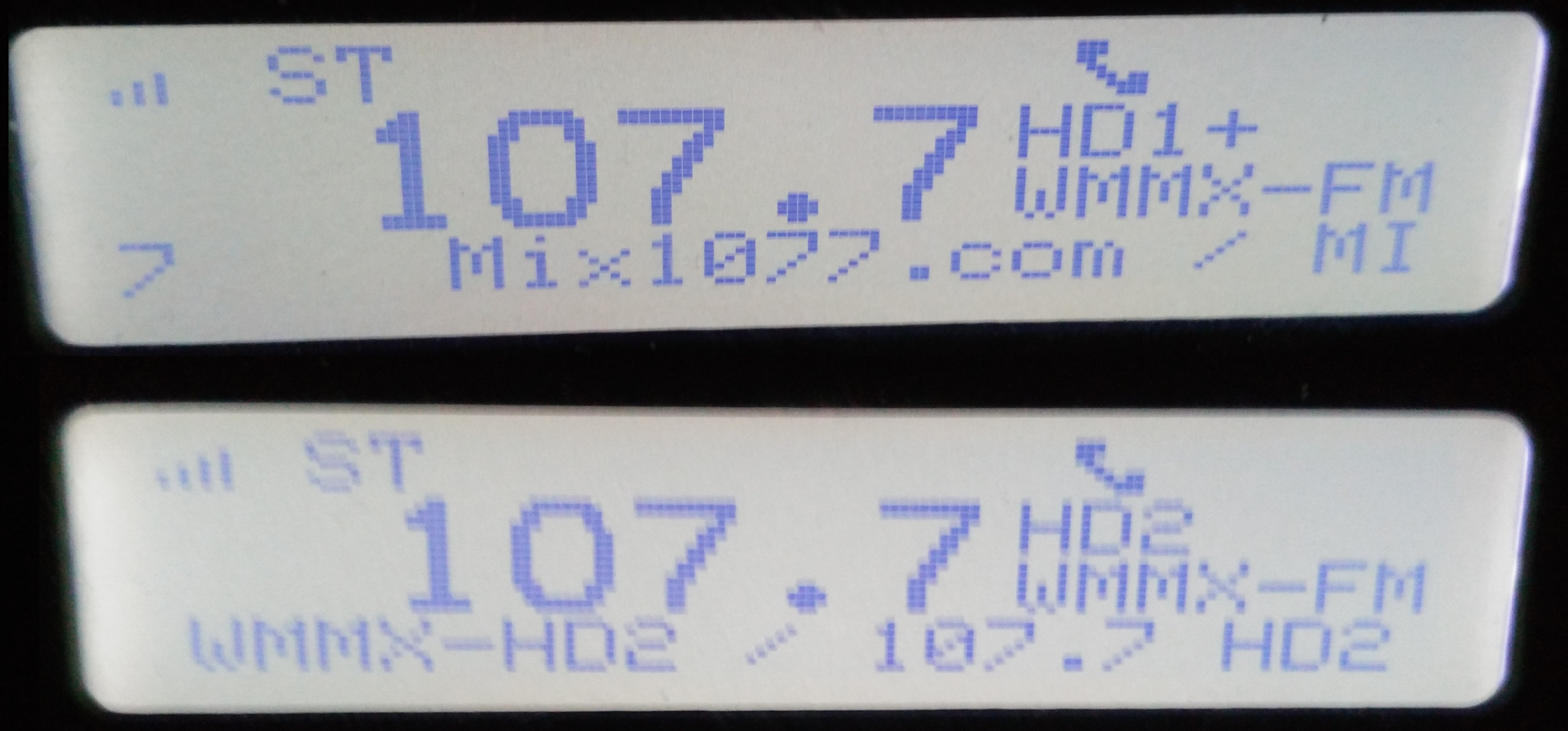
WMMX's HD Radio Channels on a SPARC Radio with PSD.

=== WDAO-FM and WWSN ===
The station signed on the air as a test broadcast on September 1, 1964. Its original call sign was WDAO. Its sister station was Big Band WAVI, a daytime-only station at 1210. WDAO was the first FM station in the US to broadcast exclusively to an African American audience. In the 1970s, the AM station was an early adopter of a talk radio format, while WDAO-FM remained an R&B station, calling itself "Ohio's Stereo Soul Giant."

On March 3, 1985, WDAO-FM's urban contemporary format moved to 1210 AM, while 107.7 FM switched to adult contemporary music. It was known as "Star 107.7" WWSN under owner Stoner Broadcasting. This format lasted six years.

=== WMMX ===
In 1991, the station switched to hot adult contemporary under Vice President/General Manager Deborah Parenti. She oversaw the April 1993 switch of call letters to WMMX. That call sign stood for the new moniker, "Mix 107.7."

In 1993, Bob Sweeney became WMMX's new morning show host, replacing morning team "The Tall Guys". His co-host was Kristi Leigh until 2005, when he moved to "Smooth Jazz 106.5 WDSJ" as morning show host. Sweeney was replaced on Mix 107.7 by PD Jeff Stevens.

Stoner Broadcasting sold WMMX to American Radio Systems in 1995, with Jacor purchasing the station in 1998. Jacor later merged with Clear Channel Communications. In 2014, Clear Channel switched its name to the current iHeartMedia, Inc.

=== 1980s hits ===
In the late 1990s, the station focused on 1980s hits along with current and recent Hot AC titles. On weekends, the station switched to all 1980s songs. This was known as "The Time Warp Weekend". Upon his move from co-owned Alternative Rock "WXEG 103.9 The X" in the Summer of 1998, PD Jeff Stevens replaced midday host Kate Burdett, who moved on to other stations in the Dayton cluster.

He also added a specialty show to the weekday line-up, "The Time Warp Cafe" from Noon-1 PM. It spotlighted music from the 1980s and adding in a "Vault" song, which reached cult status in the 1980s or was frequently played on MTV. The first song heard during this segment was "Don't Pay The Ferryman" by Chris DeBurgh. A few years later, a "Sounds like the 80s" song was added, which was a song from the early 1990s that featured a 1980s artist. The first title played was "So Close" by Daryl Hall and John Oates from 1990. The feature was later renamed "A Taste of the 90s" to broaden the selection of titles that could be played.

=== Whatever Weekend and American Top 40 ===
In 2006, the "Time Warp Weekend" was replaced by "The Whatever Weekend", in response to the growing popularity of adult hits stations across the country. In early 2010, weekends were renamed "The Weekend Mix." The 1980s focus also continued, including the airing of classic episodes of American Top 40 with Casey Kasem. They were heard Saturday mornings from 6 to 10.

WMMX has been airing the rebroadcasts of AT40 since 2001 when they were called "AT40 Flashback." The shows were condensed three-hour rebroadcasts of AT40, usually beginning the countdowns around #30. This was due to syndicator Premiere Networks believing that songs between #40-#31 would be too unknown for the target audience to remember. When Premiere canceled the program, WMMX continued to rerun the package until they were replaced by an all-new rebroadcast package from Premiere, branded as "Casey Kasem's American Top 40: The '80s." They started airing in April 2007. The shows are broadcast in their original, four-hour format.

== Former on-air staff ==
- Alan Rantz (middays 2004–06; also music director)
- Todd Hollst (overnights 2000–01; also promotions director)
- Bob Sweeney (mornings 1993–2005)
- Chris Collins (morning show news anchor/co-host 1995–2007; now at WHIO-AM-FM; also does the "Farm Market Report" for NewsCenter 7 at noon; voice of the WSU Raiders)
- Brian Michaels (2001–03; 2010 – October 2011, host of NightMix), now at WUBE-FM Cincinnati
- Sandy Collins (now News Director at 700 WLW, Cincinnati)
- Dan Edwards (now a news reporter for WDTN TV 2)
- Fred Tomlinson (1992–1996; 7:00 to Midnight on air host of "Classic Hits at Night." Host of "Saturday Night at the Oldies" on Star 107-7, and host of "Saturday Night Mix" on Mix 107-7.)
- Dean Taylor (1986–2001; traffic 2001–07; now at WHIO-TV as traffic fill-in reporter)
- Trent Darbee (overnights 1999–2000)
- Brian Bruchey (former mix morning show producer/weekends)
- Sean Roberts (weekends; now at WABX in Evansville, Indiana)
- Jamey "Flash" Meehan (weekends)
- Kate Burdett (middays)
- Joe Thomas (promotions director 2000–09, overnights 2000–01, fill-in 2000–09)
- Randy James (off-the-air program director, 1991–94)
- Jeff Ballentine (off-the-air program director, 1994–98)
- Bobbie Enderle (promotions director)
- Rick LaBeau (production, host of Saturday Night Mix since 1991, job eliminated in 2012 but rehired full-time July 2014 as production director)
- Andrew Scott (weekends)
- Eric Lee (weekends)
