= WONE (AM) =

Sports radio station in Dayton, Ohio

- Dayton, Ohio; United States
- Broadcast area: Dayton metropolitan area
- Frequency: 980 kHz
- Branding: Fox Sports 980

Programming
- Format: Sports
- Affiliations: Fox Sports Radio

Ownership
- Owner: iHeartMedia, Inc.; (iHM Licenses, LLC)
- Sister stations: WCHD, WIZE, WMMX, WTUE, WZDA

History
- First air date: March 20, 1949
- Call sign meaning: The word "one"

Technical information
- Licensing authority: FCC
- Facility ID: 1903
- Class: B
- Power: 5,000 watts
- Transmitter coordinates: 39°40′3″N 84°10′1″W
- Repeater: 104.7 WTUE-HD2 (Dayton)

Links
- Public license information: Public file; LMS
- Webcast: Listen live (via iHeartRadio)
- Website: wone.iheart.com

WONE (980 kHz) is an AM radio station in Dayton, Ohio with a sports format. It carries programming from Fox Sports Radio, as well as The Dan Patrick Show (Dan Patrick was originally an on-air personality on sister station WTUE under his real name, Dan Pugh). Its studios are located in downtown Dayton and its transmitter is in Kettering, Ohio.

== History ==
The station took the air on March 20, 1949, licensed to Skyland Broadcasting Corp. It was sold in March 1961 to Brush-Moore Newspapers, publisher of the Canton Repository. In 1965, the station was sold to Group One Broadcasting of Akron, owner of WAKR. During the mid-1960s WONE was known as "Channel 98," and it was one of Dayton's two popular Top 40 stations, the other being WING. The format changed to adult contemporary in 1968, when it was called "Charisma Radio" and "The Good Life in Dayton". Sometime thereafter, in early 1969 it switched to country music calling itself "One Country" or "Country-Wide W-1" to remain synonymous with its then-owner Group One.

=== Changes of ownership ===
On September 8, 1986, Group One was dissolved, and the station was sold to DKM Broadcasting. (One year beforehand, Group One obtained permission to place the WONE call sign on WAKR's FM sister station in Akron.) WONE's ownership passed to Stoner Broadcasting on December 9, 1992, to American Radio Systems on September 13, 1993, and to Jacor Communications on October 17, 1997.

=== Modern Country format ===
During most of the station’s years of programming country music, WONE did well in the Dayton market ratings, usually scoring first or second place in ratings among adults 18–49 years of age. The weekday programming lineup for most of the country years started with David G. McFarland in the morning drive time period, followed by Jim Howell in late mornings, John Ross in early afternoons, and Terry Wood (program director) in afternoon drive. The evening show was hosted over the years by Dean Taylor, Ed Riley and Chuck Wheeler. After-midnight shifts and weekends were hosted by Lee Nolan, Jim Lyons and others.

=== Adult standards ===
After 25 years as a country music station, WONE changed from "98 Country" to adult standards, "Dayton's ONE for Original Hits", on November 29, 1994 and acquired Springfield-based former Top 40 giant WIZE (which at the time also aired adult standards) along the way. WIZE would simulcast virtually all of WONE's programming until April 22, 2011, when WIZE broke away to launch a country format aimed specifically at the Springfield region.

=== Switch to sports talk ===
WONE adopted its present sports talk format on December 8, 2003, (as "980 Sports ONE") again competing with WING, then adopted the "Homer" nickname and weekday programming associated with WSAI 1360 AM (now on WCKY 1530 AM) in 2005. This simulcast with WCKY would eventually be severed in 2007, when WONE would start to air local sports talk in the afternoon, as well as clearing Fox Sports Radio in the morning hours (which eventually led to a clearance of Dayton native Dan Patrick's late morning show.) They are now known as Fox Sports 980. The station airs the entire Fox Sports Radio lineup. The station is an affiliate for the Dan Patrick Show. WONE is streamed online via iHeartRadio.

== Programming ==
=== Sports play-by-play ===
- Dayton affiliate for:
  - Cavaliers AudioVerse
  - Dayton Dragons baseball
  - Miami RedHawks Football
  - NFL on Westwood One
  - NCAA College Basketball on Westwood One
