= WCHD =

- Kettering, Ohio; United States
- Broadcast area: Dayton metropolitan area
- Frequency: 99.9 MHz (HD Radio)
- Branding: Channel 999

Programming
- Language: English
- Format: Contemporary hit radio
- Subchannels: HD2: WIZE simulcast
- Affiliations: Premiere Networks

Ownership
- Owner: iHeartMedia, Inc.; (iHM Licenses, LLC)
- Sister stations: WIZE, WMMX, WONE, WTUE, WZDA

History
- First air date: October 20, 1962; 63 years ago
- Former call signs: WKET (1962–1964); WVUD-FM (1964–1992); WLQT (1992–2011); WDKF (2011–2012)
- Call sign meaning: Channel Dayton

Technical information
- Licensing authority: FCC
- Facility ID: 55500
- Class: B
- ERP: 28,000 watts
- HAAT: 200 meters (660 ft)
- Transmitter coordinates: 39.722°N 84.210°W

Links
- Public license information: Public file; LMS
- Webcast: Listen live (via iHeartRadio)
- Website: channeldayton.iheart.com

WCHD (99.9 FM, "Channel 999") is a commercial radio station licensed to Kettering, Ohio, and serving the Dayton metropolitan area. The station is owned by iHeartMedia, Inc. and airs a contemporary hit radio format. Its studios are located just outside downtown Dayton and its transmitter is off Sandridge Drive near Interstate 75 in Moraine, Ohio.

WCHD broadcasts in the HD format. Its HD-2 channel is a simulcast of sister station WIZE, which airs a black-oriented news format.

== History ==
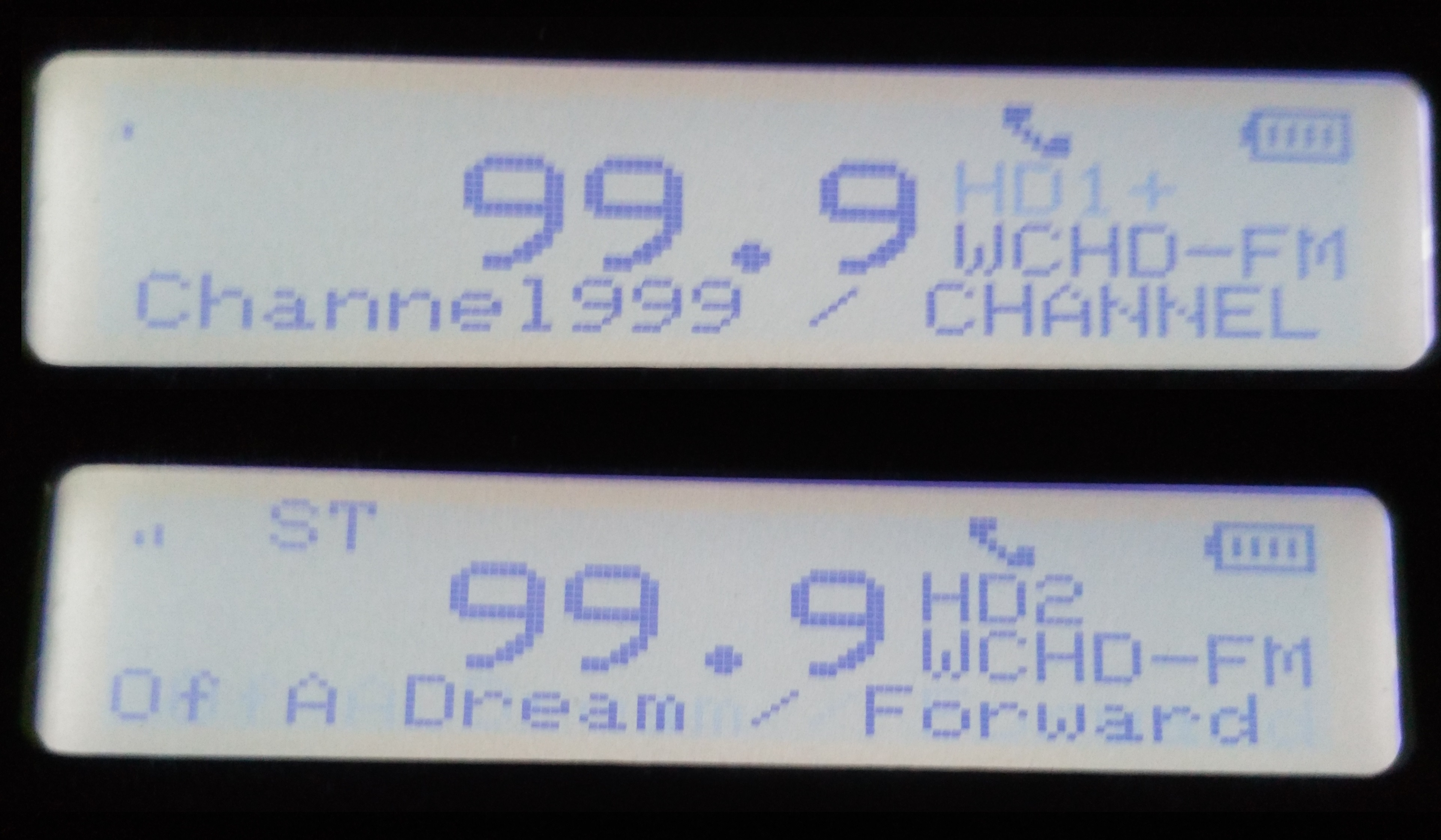
WCHD's HD Radio Channels on a SPARC Radio with PSD.

The station began its history on December 15, 1993, on 94.5 MHz as alternative rock WZJX ("94-5 X-Rock"), Dayton's first-ever alternative station. George Wymer was general manager; Randy Scovil was Program Director as well as the afternoon drive host. Steve Stone and Christy Chatman hosted the morning show, Andy Sims did mid-days, and Greg Johns hosted the evening shift. During the six months as an alternative station, X-Rock brought two sell-out shows to the Hara Arena: The Breeders and the Afghan Whigs, and later The Smashing Pumpkins. In the station's first ratings period (Jan–March 1994), X-Rock's ratings in the 18–34 demographic had already grown to half of longtime Dayton rock station WTUE.

In early May 1994, the station was sold to Terry Jacobs (formerly of Jacor) who decided to change the format to be Dayton's third oldies station, to compete with similar formats at 95.3 FM and 103.9 FM. On May 3, the X-Rock staff was fired. The station began playing 20 different versions of "Louie Louie" and calling itself "Louie 95" in an effort to entice listeners by playing different versions of the mid-1960s hit "Louie, Louie", a Richard Berry-penned song popularized by The Kingsmen, and Paul Revere and The Raiders among many others. During that time it was known as "The Chicken" in reference to its mascot, a giant whole broiled chicken dressed in seasonal clothing. It became WDOL, an oldies outlet, until August 9, 1996, when consistently minuscule ratings led to a switch to Rhythmic contemporary as WBTT, "94.5 The Beat". By 1999, it shifted to Mainstream Top 40 and began a serious challenge to take on the area's longtime rival, WGTZ. It would later drop the "Beat" branding to become WDKF, "94.5 KISS-FM", in August 2000, after Clear Channel expanded the brand to new markets. Despite the move, the station maintained a Rhythmic lean during that tenure.

In March 2005, WDKF held a "funeral" for "KISS-FM", and briefly stunted as "94.5 FM-Playing Whatever We Want, Whenever We Want". On March 30, 2005, at 3 p.m., the station relaunched as "Channel 9-4-5". Despite the changes, however, the station continues to lean Rhythmic as it battled Main Line Broadcasting's Rhythmic Contemporary rival WDHT for listeners. Main Line's other station, WGTZ, dropped its Top 40 format in November 2007 and flipped to "Fly 92.9", a "We Play Everything"-type Adult hits format, making WDKF the only CHR station in Dayton. The "Channel" branding was used previously in the late 1960s by sister station WONE (AM) "Channel 98" for its then-Top 40 format when it competed with WGTZ's AM sister WING.

In May 2009, Clear Channel Communications removed all local disc jockeys from this station, and its website. The station picked up Clear Channel's new programming initiative known as Premium Choice 24 hours a day. The playlist was generated and used nationally in addition to voice tracks and liners.

WDKF previously broadcast "Dayton's New Joints" on its HD-2 subchannel before going silent. Currently, on their HD-2 channel, is the IHeartRadio Smooth Jazz format.

On May 24, 2011, Clear Channel announced that WDKF would swap signals with sister station WLQT, thus giving the former more signal coverage in the Dayton area. On May 27, 2011, at noon, the station became "Channel 9-9-9". (In Federal Communications Commission nomenclature, the FM frequency of 99.9 MHz is actually channel 260)

On September 17, 2012, WDKF changed its call letters to WCHD to go with the "Channel 9-9-9" branding. The station has since hired a local afternoon disc jockey and its music is now being programmed by a local program director, Steven Lewis, from 6 am - 10pm. This gives Channel 9-9-9 more of a local flavor compared to most Premium Choice [Clear Channel] stations. The station previously broadcast "Dayton's New Joints" on its HD-2 subchannel before going silent. Currently, the HD-2 channel carries the IHeartRadio Smooth Jazz format.

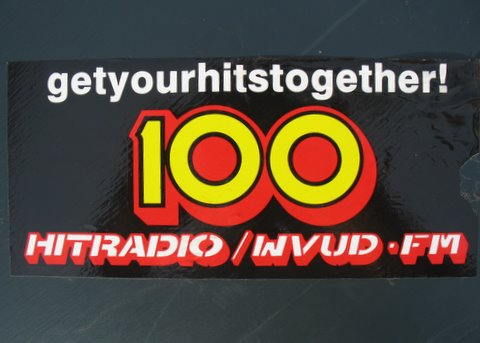
WVUD-FM logo (1983)
