= WDRK (Ohio) =

Radio station in Greenville, Ohio (1962–1989)

Greenville, Ohio; United States
- Frequency: 106.5 MHz

Ownership
- Owner: Lewel Broadcasting, Inc.

History
- First air date: April 14, 1962
- Last air date: 1989
- Call sign meaning: Darke County

Technical information
- ERP: 12 kW
- HAAT: 170 ft (52 m)

WDRK (106.5 FM) was a radio station in Greenville, Ohio, United States. It was last owned and operated by Lewel Broadcasting, Inc. The station operated for more than 25 years, much of the last decade in a fight with the Federal Communications Commission over the renewal of its broadcast license.

== History ==
WDRK began broadcasting April 14, 1962. Originally owned by John D. Kennedy and Lewis Froikin under the name Kennedy Broadcasting, Inc., it was the first radio station in Darke County, broadcasting from studios at the intersection of State Route 49 and US 127. The owners bought FM station WMER in Celina in 1968. The name on the license was changed to Lewel Broadcasting in 1969; by this time, the station was run by general manager Lee Rutherford and program director Ron Rumley, both formerly of WIFE in Indianapolis. In the early 1970s, Rumley chose Drake-Chenault's "Hit Parade" MOR automated format to significantly upgrade the sound. The two also renovated the studios, with a new station logo that recalled the former WIFE.

In 1971, the FCC ordered WDRK off the air for failing to respond to repeated requests for information in connection with that year's license renewal, dismissing the renewal application for failure to prosecute; the station was allowed to continue and given a short-term renewal. The station received a normal renewal in 1973.

In 1976, WDRK filed again to renew its license. The FCC, charging the station had falsified program logs and committed other violations, designated the case for hearing on May 26, 1977. Opposite the WDRK renewal application, Korin Broadcasting filed for a construction permit for a new station on the frequency. The commission found in March 1981 that Lewel was unqualified to be a licensee due to the repeated violations and granted the Korin application.

While WDRK appealed the bid, it ran into other trouble. Broadcast Music, Inc. sued WDRK in 1984 for playing 18 songs represented by the performing rights organization without a license. The station was able to remain on the air until 1989, as WLSN, the construction permit held by Korin, was still not built. WDRK signed off in 1989, leaving the 106.5 frequency vacant until WLSN finally signed on October 26, 1990.
