= WPCN =

Radio station in Stevens Point, Wisconsin

- Stevens Point, Wisconsin; United States
- Broadcast area: Wausau-Stevens Point area
- Frequency: 1010 kHz
- Branding: True Oldies 92.1 & 1010 AM WPCN

Programming
- Format: Oldies
- Affiliations: ABC News Radio

Ownership
- Owner: Richard L. Muzzy; (Muzzy Broadcast Group, LLC)
- Sister stations: WSPT

History
- First air date: 1948
- Former call signs: WTWT (1948–1951); WSPT (1951–1977); WXYQ (1977–1988); WSPO (1988–1996); WSPT (1996–2011)
- Call sign meaning: Portage County's News & Talk (former format)

Technical information
- Licensing authority: FCC
- Facility ID: 2106
- Class: D
- Power: 1,000 watts day; 10 watts night
- Transmitter coordinates: 44°32′17.00″N 89°35′43.00″W
- Translator: 92.1 W221CN (Marshfield)

Links
- Public license information: Public file; LMS
- Webcast: Listen Live
- Website: 921wpcn.com

WPCN (1010 AM) is a radio station broadcasting an oldies format. Licensed to Stevens Point, Wisconsin, United States, the station serves the Wausau-Stevens Point area. It is owned by Richard L. Muzzy, through licensee Muzzy Broadcast Group, LLC, and features programming from ABC News Radio.

Programming heard on WPCN includes a local morning show called Portage County Live. Former talk programming included the Glenn Beck Program, Neal Boortz, Scott Krueger (another local host), Clark Howard, and The Michael Savage Show. WPCN at one time was one of the only stations (perhaps the only station) to directly simulcast Fox News Channel. All FNC simulcasts were dropped by 2010.

== History ==
Its original call letters were WTWT when it signed on in 1948 under the ownership and operation of the Bartell Group, a group of siblings from Wisconsin who were beginning the expansion of their family radio business.

The call letters changed to WSPT on January 1, 1951. For many years, WSPT broadcast a top 40 format. The station became WXYQ on October 12, 1977. It began airing a country music format as WXYQ, "10Q Country", dropping its simulcast with WSPT-FM. The station then became WSPO on May 30, 1988. On June 6, 1996, the station changed its call sign back to WSPT; on December 6, 2011, the station changed its call sign to the current WPCN.

In March 2013, WPCN transitioned to a full-time news/talk format and dropped Cumulus Media's True Oldies Channel programming on nights and weekends. The station now carries CBS Sports Radio programming on the weekends and talk shows at night, when its power is reduced to cover only Stevens Point proper to protect clear channel station CFRB in Toronto. Previously, the station used Dial Global's America's Best Music and Citadel's Timeless Favorites.

On November 9, 2016, WPCN changed formats from news/talk to oldies, branded as "True Oldies".

== Previous logos ==
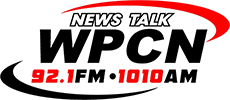
