= WHIO-TV =

Television station in Dayton, Ohio

- Dayton, Ohio; United States
- Channels: Digital: 33 (UHF); Virtual: 7
- Branding: WHIO-TV 7; Channel 7; News Center 7

Programming
- Affiliations: 7.1: CBS; for others, see § Subchannels

Ownership
- Owner: Cox Media Group; (Miami Valley Broadcasting Corporation)
- Sister stations: Radio: WHIO; WHIO-FM; WHKO; WZLR

History
- First air date: February 23, 1949
- Former channel numbers: Analog: 13 (VHF, 1949–1952), 7 (VHF, 1952–2009); Digital: 41 (UHF, 2001–2019)
- Former affiliations: DuMont (secondary, 1949–1952)
- Call sign meaning: Ohio

Technical information
- Licensing authority: FCC
- Facility ID: 41458
- ERP: 854 kW
- HAAT: 348 m (1,142 ft)
- Transmitter coordinates: 39°44′1.8″N 84°14′52.2″W

Links
- Public license information: Public file; LMS
- Website: www.whio.com

WHIO-TV (channel 7) is a television station in Dayton, Ohio, United States, affiliated with CBS. It has been owned by Cox Media Group since its inception, making it one of two stations that have been built and signed on by Cox (alongside company flagship WSB-TV in Atlanta). WHIO-TV's transmitter is located off Germantown Street in the Highview Hills neighborhood of southwest Dayton. It shares facilities with sister properties the Dayton Daily News and Cox's Miami Valley radio stations in the Cox Media Center building on South Main Street near downtown Dayton.

== History ==
WHIO-TV signed on February 23, 1949, on channel 13. It was the first television station in Dayton to begin broadcasting, although WLWD (then channel 5, now WDTN, channel 2) was the first to have its license granted.

The station has been owned by the Cox publishing family and their related companies since its inception; Cox also publishes the Dayton Daily News, the first newspaper ever purchased by Cox Enterprises founder James M. Cox. In fact, WHIO-TV is only the second of three television stations built by Cox from the ground up, merely five months after its sister property WSB-TV in Atlanta, where Cox Media Group is headquartered now. WHIO-TV's licensee, Miami Valley Broadcasting, was originally used as the official name for Cox Media's television arm for decades.

WHIO-TV has been a CBS affiliate from the very beginning, and is the only station in Dayton never to have changed its primary affiliation; it did air some programming from the long-defunct DuMont Television Network during its first three years on the air.

The station moved to channel 7 in 1952 following the release of the Federal Communications Commission (FCC)'s Sixth Report and Order, which reorganized VHF channel assignments throughout much of Ohio and the Midwest.

WHIO-TV also served as the default CBS affiliate for most of the Lima, Ohio market. (The station reaches most of the Lima DMA with a Grade B signal). This was especially the case before a low-powered CBS affiliate, WLMO-LP, went on the air in Lima. WHIO-TV also remains on Spectrum's Lima cable systems, along with Columbus CBS affiliate WBNS-TV.

In 1979, Cox Broadcasting almost filed to sell WHIO to locally based Ohio Valley Broadcasting Company, a subsidiary of M&M Broadcasting and Dyson-Kissner Associates during a proposed General Electric merger with Cox Broadcasting, with its new group being led by Stanley G. Mouse, executive vice president of Cox Broadcasting, and Jack P. McCarthy, then-vice president and general manager of the station, for $47.5 million, but the deal apparently fell through due to a lack of Federal Communications Commission approval.

On December 15, 2009, Cox Media Group announced that it would move WHIO-TV and its Dayton radio cluster–WHIO AM-FM, WHKO and WZLR–from its home since the 1950s on Wilmington Avenue in Dayton (at the Kettering city line), to the Cox Media Center building (also the current home of the Daily News) on South Main Street in Dayton, by December 2010. WHIO-TV began broadcasting from the new facility at 2:35 a.m. on December 12, 2010.

WHIO-TV's newscasts, known as NewsCenter 7 since the mid-1970s, have been in first place in the Nielsen ratings for many years, and that trend continues to this day.

WHIO-TV's digital subchannel 7.2 became an affiliate of MeTV on December 1, 2014. The subchannel is branded as "MeTV WHIO Classic Television". A longtime, formerly-used lower-case WHIO logo was included along with the MeTV logo. The subchannel's on-air advertisements include old WHIO radio jingles running over clips of former WHIO-TV anchors and current MeTV shows. The subchannel also uses jingles from the "HitRadio", "Skywave" and "Warp Factor" packages created by JAM Creative Productions in Dallas.

Digital subchannel 7.3 was added as a Laff affiliate on April 15, 2015, the network's launch date.

In February 2019, it was announced that Apollo Global Management would acquire Cox Media Group and Northwest Broadcasting's stations. Although the group had planned to operate under the name Terrier Media, it was announced in June 2019 that Apollo would also acquire Cox's radio and advertising businesses, and retain the Cox Media Group name. The sale was completed on December 17, 2019.

=== 2019 transmitter outage ===
On November 5, 2019, WHIO-TV's over-the-air (OTA) signal became unavailable to much of the market after, according to the station, defects in its new transmitter resulted in electric arcs, burning the old transmission line. According to the station, the need to inspect, repair, and/or replace over 1,000 feet (300 m) of transmission line, coupled with inclement weather and a shortage of tower repair crews due to the then-recent spectrum reallocation repack, delayed the repair process. The outage affected OTA reception of all subchannels, including 7.1 (CBS) for all satellite television viewers who subscribed to local channel packages, as the satellite providers rebroadcast WHIO-TV's OTA signal of subchannel 7.1. A few days into the outage, with the consent of WHIO-TV, DirecTV replaced the station at first with WCBS-TV from New York City, then with WKRC-TV from Cincinnati; Dish Network replaced the station with WOIO from Cleveland. Customers using cable or streaming television services were still able to view WHIO-TV programming. On November 15, per an agreement with Greater Dayton Public Television, owner of PBS member WPTD (channel 16), WHIO-TV requested special temporary authority from the FCC to transmit its main (CBS) subchannel over subchannel 16.2, displacing WPTD's "16 Again" service. On November 18, WPTD subchannel 16.2 began broadcasting WHIO-TV programming OTA, and this feed was also picked up by DirecTV and Dish Network. The resolution on 16.2 was in 480i standard definition, compared to channel 7.1's 1080i high definition and the signal also lacked closed captioning; on the first day of broadcast, most of the audio feed was missing, but this was subsequently corrected; subchannels 7.2 (MeTV) and 7.3 (Laff) remained unavailable to OTA viewers. On November 21, 2019, WHIO-TV announced its signal was once again available for OTA viewers; DirecTV and Dish Network restored WHIO-TV's signal from subchannel 7.1 and WPTD returned to normal content on subchannel 16.2. Once WHIO-TV's digital broadcast was restored, many OTA viewers had to rescan their tuners to pick up the station's signal since they would have already rescanned for WDTN's November 8 move.

=== Post-2019 ===
MeTV Toons was added to the lineup on subchannel 7.4 effective July 2, 2024.

== Tri-State Network ==
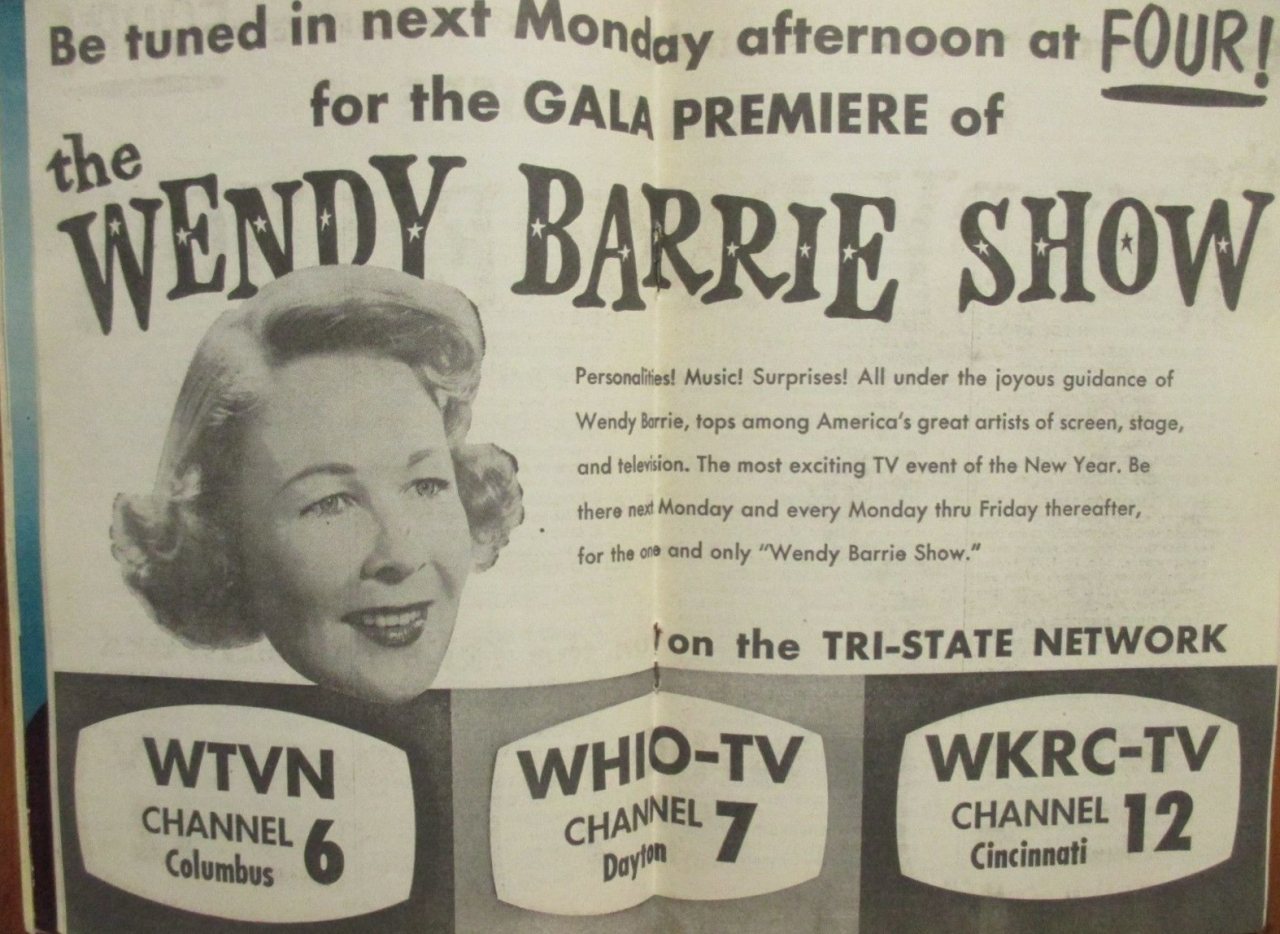
Advertisement for the premiere of The Wendy Barrie Show, originating from WHIO-TV in Dayton and simulcast on WKRC-TV in Cincinnati and WTVN (now WSYX) in Columbus.

In 1953, Cox and Taft Broadcasting formed the short-lived "Tri-State Network" to compete with entertainment programming produced by Crosley Broadcasting Corporation and airing on Crosley television stations in the Dayton, Cincinnati and Columbus markets. On January 11, 1954, a new version of The Wendy Barrie Show (which had aired several years earlier on several national networks) premiered from WHIO-TV's studios; it was simulcast on Taft's WKRC-TV in Cincinnati and WTVN (now WSYX) in Columbus. Wendy Barrie's contract was terminated in October 1954.

== Logo ==
Throughout the 1960s and into the early 1970s, WHIO-TV's logo was the numeral "7" with the station's call letters and city of license inside a perforated circle. By the early 1970s the logo was streamlined, with the "7" now broken at the point where the two lines in the "7" meet; by this time the "7" was by itself inside a solid unbroken circle (usually with the call letters nearby), drawing comparisons with the "Circle 7 logo" used by New York's WABC-TV and other ABC-owned stations. A graphics package used around 1996 also was used, with modifications, at three other Cox-owned stations: WSOC-TV in Charlotte, WFTV in Orlando, and KIRO-TV in Seattle. Aside from some slight changes, this logo remained until early 2007, when the break was removed. Even after the change, the "broken 7" logo remained on the anchor desk until the move to the Cox Media Center building in December 2010.

The station debuted its new "button 7" logo on March 30, 2013, which sports a simple white "7" on a blue circular background.

The television station's call letters, as well as those of its sister radio stations, were depicted in a particular lower-case font from the 1970s until 1992. That logo was resurrected to become part of the branding for the MeTV digital subchannel.

== Programming ==
=== Sports programming ===
The Dayton Dragons began televising games on digital channel 7.2 (Time Warner Cable channels 23 and 372) on April 9, 2009, eventually airing 25 games per season. In the 2016 season, the Dragons telecasts moved to WBDT.

WHIO also airs all Cincinnati Bengals games carried by CBS. As Dayton is 50 miles from Cincinnati, it is considered a secondary market to the Bengals, meaning all road games must be televised in their entirety. Given that the Bengals are the most popular team in the Dayton market, WHIO airs both home and road games.

The Cleveland Browns' preseason games are aired by WHIO games when possible, in addition to regular season games.

In 2024, WHIO reached an agreement with the University of Dayton to air select men's basketball games.

=== Weather ===
==== Storm Center 7 ====
WHIO-TV currently calls its team of meteorologists the "Storm Center 7 weather team". WHIO-TV bills its radar (which is powered by Baron Services) as "Live Doppler 7".

WHIO-TV did not use its own professional meteorologists until 1993, with the hiring of Penn State meteorology graduate Heidi Sonen. The station dropped the AccuWeather service it had previously featured and hired other meteorologists to fill out the staff, including former Weather Channel meteorologist Fred Barnhill. USAF meteorologist Warren Madden was hired from nearby Wright-Patterson Air Force Base; he went to The Weather Channel in December 1996.

After Sonen's retirement in 1997, the station hired more Penn State graduates for the role of Chief Meteorologist, including Brian Orzel and Jamie Simpson.

In December 2004, the station introduced StormCenter 7, which is a weather center created by FX Group that doubles as a set where weather reports can be done.

On May 7, 2015, the station announced that it had hired Eric Elwell as its new chief meteorologist, with Brett Collar hired as the new weekend morning meteorologist. Both were announced to be starting in June, with all existing meteorologists at the station remaining, but in some cases being rotated on the schedule. Collar officially began on June 20, 2015, with Elwell's first day on June 29, 2015.

On November 19, 2018, WHIO-TV announced that it had hired McCall Vrydaghs as its chief meteorologist, effective immediately. Elwell would continue to work for the station as the meteorologist for the noon broadcast prior to leaving the station at the end of the year to move closer to his family in Columbus. Vrydaghs had been part of the team of meteorologists with the station since 2012. With Vrydaghs' promotion, Dontae Jones, who had previously been working as a morning meteorologist in North Carolina, also joined the team.

On June 28, 2023, WHIO-TV announced that Austin Chaney would return to WHIO as chief meteorologist. Chaney had previously worked for WHIO as a weekend meteorologist before being promoted to sister station WSOC-TV in Charlotte, North Carolina. The Chaney family has ties to southwest Ohio. Austin Chaney is the grandson of former Cincinnati Reds shortstop Darrel Chaney.

==== Live Doppler 7 ====
On June 29, 2007, WHIO-TV debuted its new doppler weather radar, initially billed as "New Live Doppler 7", then "Live Doppler 7 HD". The radar was used in every weathercast and, for several years, on the station's website, but, though retaining the "Live Doppler 7" name on-air, WHIO discontinued operation of its radar in June 2021.

==== 7 Weather Now ====
On December 15, 2006, WHIO-TV launched 7 Weather Now, programmed 24 hours a day, with a mix of frequently updated locally produced forecasts and content from the AccuWeather Channel. Live coverage of developing severe weather could be found on 7 Weather Now, as well as the latest watches and warnings. Weekday mornings from 7 to 8 a.m., the final hour of News Center 7 Daybreak was rebroadcast on the channel. Effective December 1, 2014, 7 Weather Now is no longer programmed on digital channel 7.2 but can be found as a live stream at the station's website and through the WHIO Weather mobile app.

=== Widescreen and high definition news ===
WHIO-TV began broadcasting its newscasts in a 16:9 widescreen standard definition format on April 1, 2007; it was the first Ohio station outside of Cleveland to switch to this new format.

In the station's December 12, 2010, move to the Cox Media Center, all of its cameras, graphics and equipment were replaced with full high definition equipment. Beginning with that day's late-night newscast (which was delayed to 11:26 p.m. due to an overrun of CBS network programming), WHIO-TV began broadcasting all locally-shot portions of its newscasts — studio segments and live field reports — in high definition.

WHIO-TV remained the only station in the Dayton area to broadcast local newscasts in high definition or 16:9 widescreen until July 21, 2012, when WDTN made the upgrade to HD. WKEF followed suit during a move to a new facility. Local commercials on WHIO-TV, however, continue to be stretched from their original 4:3 standard definition to widescreen dimensions.

On January 21, 2016, WHIO-TV debuted a new set, designed by FX Group.

=== Notable alumni ===
- Jim Baldridge, co-anchor 1972–1988, lead anchor 1988–2009
- Phil Donahue, co-anchor during the 1960s
- Mick Hubert, sports anchor/director 1979–1989
- Tracie Savage, anchor/reporter 1986–1991
- Bob Shreve, overnight host of Night People Theater, a Friday night/Saturday morning movie program, similar to his Saturday night program in Cincinnati
- Gil Whitney, weather specialist, reporter, anchor and emcee

== Trivia ==
The highest quality surviving broadcast copy of The Star Wars Holiday Special is derived from this TV station.

== Technical information ==
=== Subchannels ===
The station's signal is multiplexed:

Subchannels of WHIO-TV
Subchannel	Res.	Short name	Programming
7.1	1080i	WHIO-HD	CBS
7.2	1080i	Me TV	MeTV
7.3	480i	LAFF	Laff
7.4	480i	MeToons	MeTV Toons
45.3	480i	Antenna	Antenna TV (WRGT-TV)

Broadcast on behalf of another station

=== Analog-to-digital conversion ===
WHIO-DT began transmitting its digital signal on channel 41 in October 2001. The station shut down its analog signal, over VHF channel 7, on June 12, 2009, the official date on which full-power television stations in the United States transitioned from analog to digital broadcasts under federal mandate. The station's digital signal remained on its pre-transition UHF channel 41, using virtual channel 7.

WHIO-TV moved its digital signal from channel 41 to channel 33 at 10 a.m. on October 18, 2019, as part of the FCC's spectrum reallocation process.

== See also ==
- Channel 7 virtual TV stations in the United States
- Channel 33 digital TV stations in the United States
- List of television stations in Ohio
- List of television stations in Ohio (by channel number)
- List of television stations in the United States by call sign (initial letter W)
- Miami Valley Channel (cable channel operated by WHIO-TV from September 1994 through the end of 2006; served as UPN affiliate from October 1998 to September 2006)
