= WHIO (AM) =

News/talk radio station in Dayton, Ohio, United States

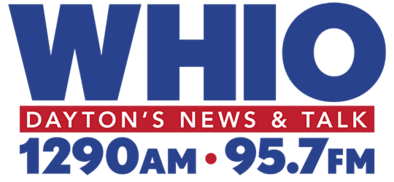
- Dayton, Ohio; United States
- Broadcast area: Dayton metropolitan area
- Frequency: 1290 kHz
- Branding: AM 1290 and News 95.7 WHIO

Programming
- Format: Talk radio
- Affiliations: Fox News Radio; Compass Media Networks; Premiere Networks; Dayton Flyers; Cleveland Browns Radio Network

Ownership
- Owner: Cox Media Group; (CMG Radio Operating Company, LLC)
- Sister stations: WHIO-FM; WHIO-TV; WHKO; WZLR

History
- First air date: February 9, 1935
- Call sign meaning: Ohio

Technical information
- Licensing authority: FCC
- Facility ID: 14244
- Class: B
- Power: 5,000 watts
- Transmitter coordinates: 39°40′44″N 84°7′49″W
- Repeater: 95.7 WHIO-FM (Pleasant Hill)

Links
- Public license information: Public file; LMS
- Webcast: Listen live; Listen live (via Audacy)
- Website: www.whio.com

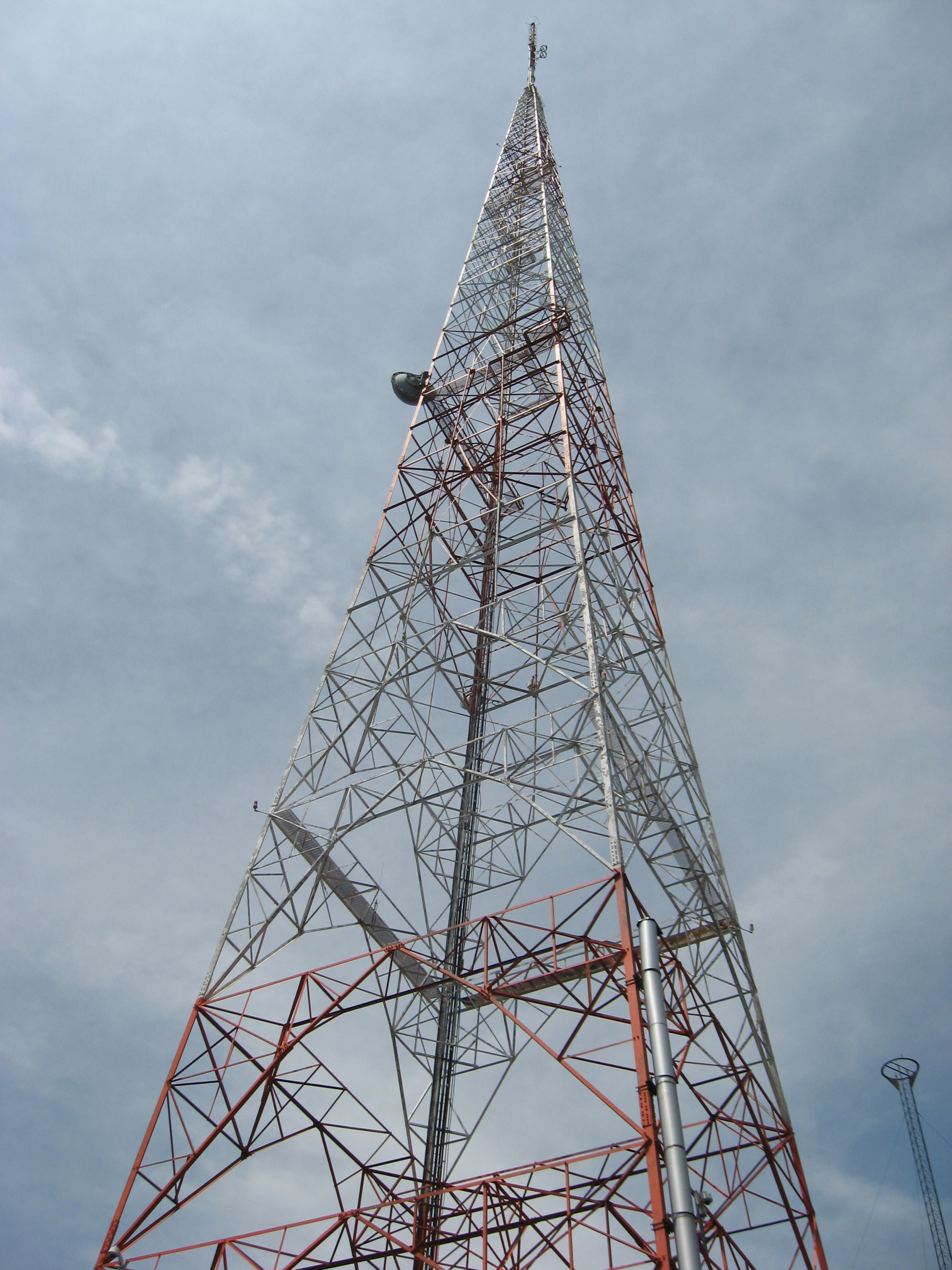
The Cox Enterprises broadcasting tower was located outside the old studio in Kettering, Ohio, before the studio building on Wilmington Pike was torn down in 2017.

WHIO (1290 AM, "AM 1290 and News 95.7 WHIO") is a commercial radio station in Dayton, Ohio. It simulcasts a talk format with WHIO-FM (95.7). They are owned by Cox Media Group. The studios are at the Cox Media Center on South Main Street (Ohio State Route 48) in Dayton.

WHIO's transmitter is sited on East David Road in Kettering.

== History ==
=== As WLBW in Oil City, Pennsylvania ===
The original call letters and origin of the station was WLBW in Oil City Pennsylvania. To create a new radio service in Dayton, Cox had to purchase WLBW in Oil City, from the Petroleum Telephone Company. Cox shut down the Pennsylvania operation and moved the radio station to Dayton.

=== Move to Dayton, Ohio ===
WHIO was Cox Radio's first station started by company founder Ohio Governor James M. Cox. It signed on the air on February 9, 1935. The original studios were in the Dayton Daily News building downtown, on Ludlow Street.

The station first broadcast with a power of 1,000 watts on 1260 kHz, which had been the frequency of WLBW. With the enactment of the North American Regional Broadcasting Agreement (NARBA) in 1941, WHIO moved to its current frequency at 1290 kHz. When NARBA went into effect, 90% of all AM stations in America were forced to change frequencies.

At its founding, WHIO was an NBC Red Network affiliate, also taking some shows from the NBC Blue Network. In the 1940s, WHIO switched to the CBS Radio Network. Then, as network programming moved from radio to television, WHIO switched to a full service, middle of the road format of popular music, news and sports.

=== FM and TV stations ===
In 1946, Cox Radio added an FM station, 99.1 WHIO-FM. At first, WHIO-FM simulcast the AM station. But in the 1960s, it began airing a beautiful music format. And in 1989, it became WHKO with a country music format.

In 1949, Cox added a TV station, WHIO-TV on Channel 13 (later on Channel 7). Because WHIO had been a CBS Radio affiliate, WHIO-TV also began airing CBS television programs. WHIO-TV, along with WHIO 1290 and WHKO 99.1, have been owned by Cox since their founding.

=== Past personalities ===
WHIO's long history in the market included Lou Emm. Emm was a popular host of variety shows, live remote broadcasts and station promotions. He started at WHIO in the early 1940s and retired in 1992. When Emm died a few years later, all Dayton radio stations paused for a moment of silence.

Phil Donahue started at WHIO as the host of the weekday talk show "Conversation Piece" in the 1960s before his move to television and competitor Channel 2 WLWD (now WDTN) in 1967. His show became nationally syndicated beginning in 1970. During this era, Winston Hoehner was news director at WHIO for 25 years and was a member of the Ohio Associated Press Broadcast Journalism Hall of Fame. He died in 1990.

WHIO was the originating station of a regional news network in the 1960s and 1970s which was aired late afternoons on stations in surrounding communities throughout the Miami Valley as "The DP&L News Network" (named for its sponsor, The Dayton Power and Light Company). A similar network aired in the 1990s during this same time frame as "The Newscenter 7 Radio Network".

=== FM simulcast ===
On October 30, 2006, Cox Radio pulled the plug on the all-1980s hits format on WDPT "95.7 The Point". The FM station switched to a simulcast of WHIO's news/talk format. WDPT took the new call sign WHIO-FM. The FM station has an effective radiated power (ERP) of 50,000 watts.

WHIO-FM strong FM signal helps the two stations cover much of south central Ohio, also reaching into Eastern Indiana. The simulcast gives listeners the choice of hearing WHIO on either AM or FM.

== Programming ==
Weekdays on WHIO-AM-FM begin with The Miami Valley's Morning News anchored by Larry Hansgen and Brittany Otto. In PM drive time, a local talk program is heard, The Evening Edge Todd Hollst. The rest of the day features nationally syndicated talk programs: Brian Kilmeade and Friends, The Erick Erickson Show, The Sean Hannity Show, Fox Across America with Jimmy Failla and Coast to Coast AM with George Noory. Weekends feature specialty shows on money, health, cars and gardening as well as repeats of weekday programs. The station is the Dayton Fox News Radio affiliate, however most of the news featured at the top and bottom of the hour is hosted by local anchors.

WHIO-AM-FM serve as the flagship stations for University of Dayton Flyers football and basketball. WHIO also serves as the Dayton home for Cleveland Browns play-by-play football during the NFL season.
