= WTKD (FM) =

Radio station in Greenville, Ohio

- Greenville, Ohio; United States
- Broadcast area: Dayton, Ohio
- Frequency: 106.5 MHz
- Branding: 106.5 The Truth

Programming
- Format: Religious

Ownership
- Owner: Delmarva Educational Association

History
- First air date: 1990 (as WLSN)
- Former call signs: WLSN (1982–1999); WBKI (1999–2003); WDJO (2003–2004); WDSJ (2004–2014); WOLT (5/2014-6/2014); WRZX (2014–2021); WRZX-FM (2021)

Technical information
- Licensing authority: FCC
- Facility ID: 67615
- Class: B
- ERP: 50,000 watts
- HAAT: 146 meters (479 ft)
- Transmitter coordinates: 40.147°N 84.610°W

Links
- Public license information: Public file; LMS
- Webcast: Listen Live
- Website: WTKD Online

WTKD (106.5 FM, "The Truth") is a radio station licensed to Greenville, Ohio serving most of the Dayton metropolitan area with a rimshot signal. The station is owned by Truth Broadcasting, Inc. The current programming features Christian talk and teaching radio using the Truth Network. The transmitter is in Greenville, Ohio.

WTKD is licensed by the FCC to broadcast in the hybrid digital HD format.

== History ==
The station launched in 1990 as WLSN, owned by Treaty City Broadcasting airing beautiful music mixed with smooth jazz with a taller and more powerful transmitter installed north of Greenville replacing the less powerful WDRK tower on the south edge of town. Around this same time the former WHIO-FM switched from a similar format to country as WHKO "K-99.1 FM".

In 1997, WLSN was sold to Jacor Communications, later becoming WBKI ("Buckeye Country 106.5") in 1998 competing with WHKO until the merger with Clear Channel becoming WDJO (a call sign used previously at 1230 AM in Cincinnati) as "Dayton's Jammin' Oldies 106.5". Eventually, the late 1960s and 1970s rhythmic oldies format failed to attract sizeable listeners. The WDJO calls themselves have since moved back to a station licensed to Cincinnati at 1480 AM, as a 1950s and 1960s oldies station.

When a group of listeners of the former WLSN joined and complained about the lack of smooth jazz in the Dayton market, it was recommended that it would go back to what it was a decade earlier. Thus it became WDSJ, which enjoyed a considerably large following in the Dayton market, eastern Indiana and the northern suburbs of Cincinnati since its switch to smooth jazz. WDSJ aired programming from Broadcast Architecture's "Smooth Jazz Network".

On Friday, May 1, 2009, the smooth jazz format ended at 5 pm Eastern time according to the WDSJ website. It became "106.5 The Bull" with a country music format and a new website that went online on the morning of May 2, 2009.

Logo as "Big 106.5"

On March 25, 2010, WDSJ changed its format to classic hits, branded as "Big 106.5". The station was using Premium Choice with voicetracked DJs.

On May 26, 2014, 106.5 changed callsigns from WDSJ to WOLT. On June 20, 2014, 106.5 changed callsigns from WOLT to WRZX, swapping with 103.3 FM in Indianapolis.

In 2014, WRZX began playing Christmas music during the holiday season, replacing WMMX, and has been featured on WDTN. The station normally played Christmas music from mid-November through Christmas Day. In 2019, WRZX flipped to Christmas music as of Noon on November 1; previously, it would flip anywhere from November 8, or as late as November 17 or 18.

On May 4, 2020, at 12:17 a.m., the station changed from 1970s and 1980s based classic hits to 1960s-based oldies. The final song under the classic hits format was Survivor's "High on You." The first song from the new format was Aretha Franklin's "Think." No explanation on the website or in social media was given for the change. The new slogan for the station is "Dayton's '60s and ’70s Hits".

On May 17, 2021, it was announced that WRZX and its sister station WYDB were being donated to Delmarva Educational Association from the trust. On July 9, the station slightly altered callsigns to WRZX-FM ahead of the sale; iHeart transferred the WRZX calls, with no addition, to another station of theirs in suburban Atlanta. The sale closed on August 2, 2021, with Delmarva Educational Association flipping the station to Christian radio at Midnight that day. The last song on "Big 106.5" was "Something" by The Beatles. The call letters were also changed to WTKD. Currently, the station is simulcasting WTOD in Toledo, including its station identification.
