= Mass media in Dayton, Ohio =

The following is a list of mass media in Dayton, Ohio, United States.

== Print ==
=== Daily ===
- The Dayton Daily News

=== Weekly/business ===
- Dayton Business Journal
- Dayton City Paper
- Dayton Weekly

=== Online ===
- Dayton Local
- Dayton Most Metro
- DaytonLocalMusic.com
- Inclusion Magazine

=== Alternative ===
- Active Dayton

=== Collegiate ===
- Clarion - the student newspaper of Sinclair Community College
- Flyer News - the semiweekly student newspaper at the University of Dayton
- The Guardian - the weekly student newspaper at Wright State University

== Television ==
Nielsen Media Research ranked the 11-county Dayton television market #65 in the United States. Among the stations it includes are:

- 2 WDTN Dayton (NBC)
- 7 WHIO-TV Dayton (CBS)
- 16 WPTD Dayton (PBS)
- 22 WKEF, Dayton (ABC/Fox)
- 26 WBDT Springfield (The CW)
- 43 WKOI-TV Richmond, IN (Ion Television)*
- 45 WRGT-TV Dayton (MyNetworkTV)

Television stations from Cincinnati, Ohio are available with varying levels of reception.

The nationally syndicated morning talk show The Daily Buzz originated from WBDT-TV, the Acme property in Miamisburg, Ohio, before moving to its current home in Florida.

== Broadcast radio ==
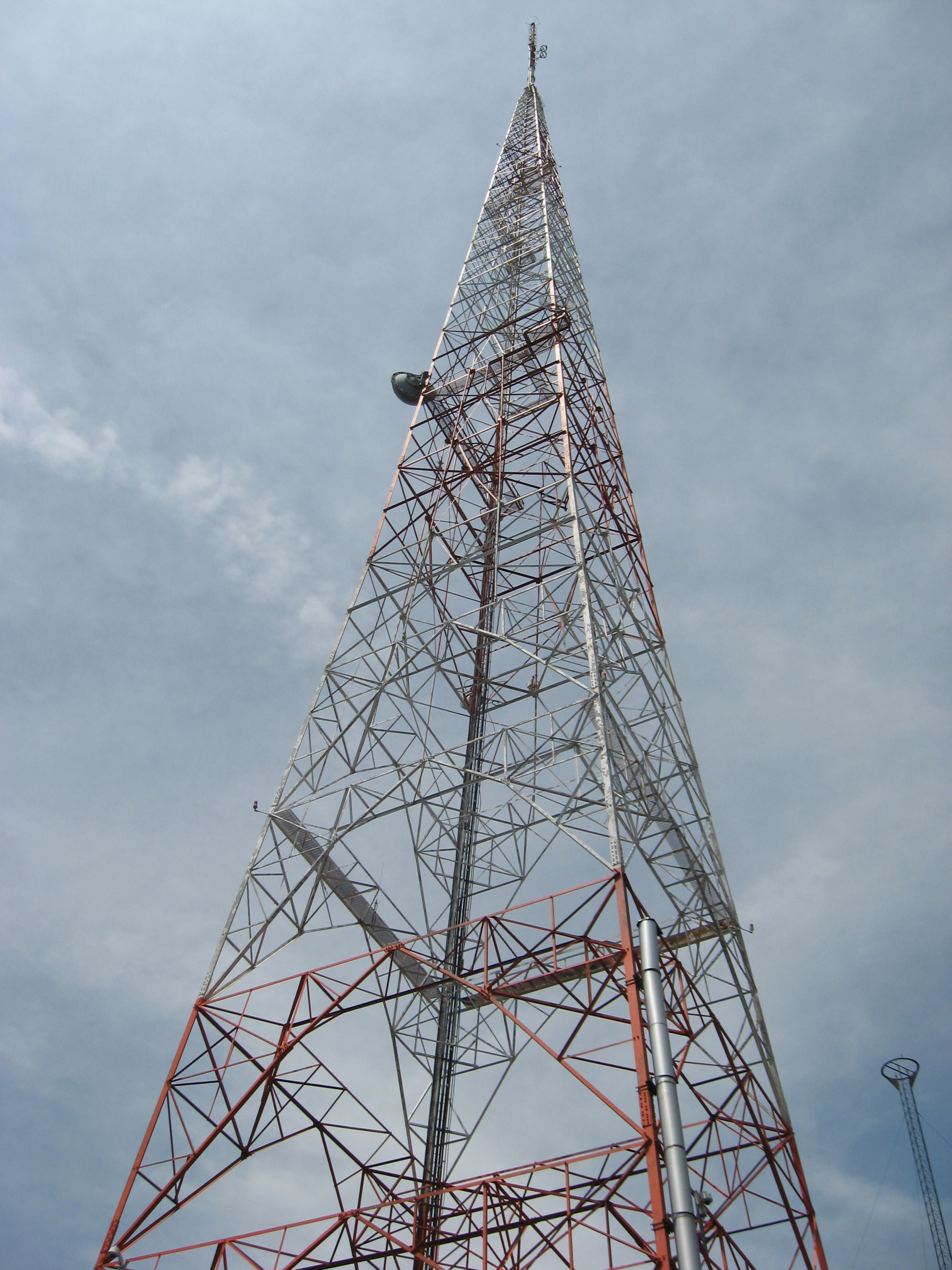
The Cox Enterprises broadcasting tower located outside the news station in Kettering, Ohio

=== AM stations ===
- 700 WLW Cincinnati (Talk/sports)^{1}
- 910 WPFB Middletown (Catholic-EWTN)
- 980 WONE Dayton (Sports)
- 1090 WKFI Wilmington (Classic country)^{2}
- 1110 WGNZ Fairborn (Gospel)^{2}
- 1130 WEDI Eaton (Classic country)^{2}
- 1210 WDAO Dayton (Urban contemporary)^{2}
- 1290 WHIO Dayton (Talk)
- 1340 WIZE Springfield (Black Information Network)
- 1410 WING Dayton (Sports)
- 1500 WBZI Xenia (Classic country)^{2}
- 1570 WPTW Piqua (Oldies)
- 1600 WULM Springfield (Radio Maria)

^{1} clear-channel station
^{2} daytime-only station

=== FM stations ===
Asterisk (*) indicates a non-commercial (public radio/campus/educational) broadcast. Cross (^{†}) indicates a time-share operation between the two stations.

- 88.1 WDPR Dayton (NPR/classical)*
- 88.9 WCSU-FM – Urban Contemporary
- 89.1 WUSO Springfield (College/variety)*
- 89.5 WDPS Dayton (Campus/variety)*^{†}
- 89.5 WQRP Dayton (Radio Nueva Vida)*^{†}
- 89.9 WLHS West Chester (Adult standards/MOR)*
- 90.3 WKCD Cedarville (K-Love)*
- 91.3 WYSO Yellow Springs (NPR/talk/variety)*
- 92.1 WROU-FM West Carrollton (Urban AC)
- 92.9 WGTZ Eaton (Adult hits)
- 93.7 WFCJ Miamisburg (Christian)
- 94.5 WOXY Englewood (Oldies)
- 94.9 WREW Fairfield (Adult contemporary)
- 95.3 WZLR Xenia (Classic hits)
- 95.7 WHIO-FM Pleasant Hill (Talk)
- 96.5 WFTK Lebanon (Active rock)
- 96.9 WYDA Troy (Air1)*
- 97.3 WSWO-LP Huber Heights (LPFM/oldies)*
- 98.1 WUDR Dayton (College/variety)*
- 98.3 WKET Kettering (Campus/variety)*
- 99.1 WHKO Dayton (Country)
- 99.9 WCHD Kettering (Contemporary hit radio)
- 100.7 WEEC Springfield (Worship music)*
- 101.5 WCLI-FM Enon (Country)
- 102.9 WDHT Urbana (Mainstream urban)
- 103.5 WGRR Hamilton (Classic hits)
- 103.9 WZDA Beavercreek (Country)
- 104.7 WTUE Dayton (Classic rock)
- 105.9 WNKN Middletown (Classic country)
- 106.5 WTKD Greenville (Christian)
- 106.9 WWSU Fairborn (College/variety)*
- 107.1 WTJN-LP Troy (LPFM/community)*
- 107.7 WMMX Dayton (Hot AC)
