= WOXY (disambiguation) =

WOXY may refer to:

- WOXY.com, a defunct Internet radio station
- WKRP-FM, a radio station (97.7 FM) licensed to Mason, Ohio, United States that previously held the call sign WOXY
- WOXY 94.5 FM, a radio station licensed to Englewood, Ohio, United States
