= 97X =

97X might refer to:

== Broadcasting ==
- WKRP-FM, an FM radio station (97.7 MHz) licensed to Mason, Ohio; known as 97X from 1983 to 2004
  - WOXY.com, an Internet radio station known as 97X: The Future of Rock and Roll
- WSUN (FM), an FM radio station (97.1 MHz) in Tampa Bay, Florida; known as 97X from 2000 to 2022
- WXLP, an FM radio station (96.9 MHz) from the Quad Cities region of Iowa and Illinois
- WYYX, an FM radio station (97.7 MHz) in Panama City, Florida; known as 97X from 1997 to 2025

== Transportation ==
- 97X Kelowna RapidBus, a bus route in Kelowna, British Columbia, Canada
- Saab 9-7X, a car model
