= WOKL =

WOKL may refer to:

- WOKL (FM), a radio station (89.1 FM) licensed to serve Round Lake Beach, Illinois, United States
- WYDA, a radio station (96.9 FM) licensed to serve Troy, Ohio, United States, which held the call sign WOKL from 2003 to 2012
- WGMY, a radio station (107.1 FM) licensed to serve Thomasville, Georgia, United States, which held the call sign WOKL from 1998 to 1999
