= WCTM =

WCTM-FM and WCTM
Eaton, Ohio; United States
- Broadcast area: Eaton and Preble County, plus Dayton and Richmond area
- Frequencies: WCTM-FM: 92.9 MHz (1959–1974, now WGTZ); WCTM: 1130 kHz (1981–2004, now WEDI)
- Branding: Radio Ranch 1130 WCTM

Programming
- Format: Community radio; beautiful music with middle of the road, adult standards, big band and occasional soft adult contemporary
- Affiliations: Mutual Broadcasting System; CNN Radio; Agri Broadcasting Network; Brownfield Network; Ohio News Network; Sports Ohio Network; Motor Racing Network; Performance Racing Network; USA Radio Network

Ownership
- Owner: Stanley T. Coning; (Western Ohio Broadcasting Service Inc.)

History
- Call sign meaning: Waring Coning Toney Markle (four partners in original FM owners)_

Technical information
- Power: WCTM: 250 watts, daytime (AM)
- ERP: WCTM-FM: 25,000 watts (FM)

WCTM were the call letters assigned to an FM radio station, and later an AM station, both licensed to Eaton, Preble County, Ohio, United States.

== WCTM-FM ==
WCTM (92.9 FM) was originally a station built by Stan Coning and three partners organized as Western Ohio Broadcasting Service, in 1959. The station's call letters came from the partners in the venture: Ralph Waring, Stan Coning, Howard Toney, and T. Somers Markle. The first tower for the FM station was purchased from WLW, and was 150 meters (490 ft) tall. The tower was originally three separate 50-meter (160 ft) AM tower/antennas, which had been used by WLW as part of a directional antenna to limit, toward Canada, its 500 kilowatt signal allowed during the 1930s and 1940, to the equivalent of 50 kilowatts. The station aired an "easy listening/beautiful music" format. The original FM station's studios, transmitter and tower were located at 505 North Barron Street in Eaton where Coning beforehand originally owned an appliance service business. For a time in the early-to-mid-1960s, WCTM was on the Cincinnati Reds Baseball Network and also aired play-by-play of area high school football and basketball games. In the 1960s, the station provided news and features from Eaton, Preble County and the surrounding area and also aired news and programming from the Mutual Broadcasting System.

WCTM-FM, with an -FM prefix added to the callsign in 1971, was sold in November 1974 to Great Trails Broadcasting, which was then the owner of WING in Dayton, WIZE in Springfield and WCOL and WCOL-FM in Columbus, and became WJAI. Great Trails spent a great deal of time and money moving the station's tower to better serve the Dayton market. WJAI continued the easy listening format until 1979, when it switched to a country music format. The station then changed to big band/nostalgia/adult standards in 1982 before becoming WGTZ ("Z-93"), a Top 40 station, in 1984. After several other format changes, WGTZ is a classic hits station as of 2026.

== WCTM on AM ==
After the FM station was sold, Coning focused on acquiring an AM license (he had originally wanted to build an AM station, but the lack of available frequencies led him to build the FM station first). After a 12-year struggle to obtain a frequency, WCTM (1130 AM) went on the air in 1981 as a daytime-only station and picked up where the FM left off a decade earlier, playing beautiful music. The studios and transmitter were located east of Eaton in an open field behind an abandoned drive-in theater (since razed) in the rural Preble County community of Glenwood (a.k.a. "Ransom" on some online highway maps near West Alexandria, which was the station's mailing address).

Coning ran the operation by himself, using a home-built reel-to-reel automation system (a little box called a "Tel-Timer" gave the time and temperature in a computerized voice), while freelance voice-over announcers Darrel Studebaker, John Bauman (engineer) and Jim Linthicum voiced commercials, liners and announcements. The station's call letters were often said on the air to mean "We Cherish This Music".

In addition to its beautiful music format, WCTM aired farm and agricultural programming from Ed Johnson's Agri Broadcast Network (for western Ohio farmers) and Derry Brownfield's Brownfield Network (for eastern Indiana farmers), helping to earn the station its nickname, "Radio Ranch 1130". This nickname was probably inspired by Ohio country music artist Donnie Bowser and the Radio Ranch Boys, and by KWKH, a country music station in Shreveport, Louisiana which also broadcast at 1130 kHz and used the "Radio Ranch" nickname.

WCTM aired local sports for a time, along with NASCAR coverage on weekends and the syndicated "Waxworks" nostalgia/big band program hosted by Gary Hannes. WCTM was also the first Ohio radio station to affiliate with Ted Turner's CNN Radio in 1983. Later, the station aired USA Radio Network news and sports. In its final years, the "beautiful music" format was often peppered with Stan Coning's soft-spoken recollections of his early life in Eaton and people he had known.

== The end of WCTM ==
In its last few years, WCTM operated almost as a public service. Few commercials were heard, donations were accepted to help keep the station on the air, and sign-on/sign-off times were almost entirely dependent on how long Coning could remain at the station (a typical daily sign-off was around 5 P.M., with no broadcasts at all on Sundays). During this period, a friend of Coning's with the on-air name of "John Grant" hosted weekly programs and assisted with station maintenance and operations.

Due to his failing health, which had taken the station off the air for extended periods of time, Stan Coning finally sold his little station to Town & Country Broadcasting, owner of WBZI in Xenia. WCTM signed off for the last time on June 24, 2004, an event which was covered by two Dayton TV stations. As a one-man operation with an easy-listening format, WCTM was widely regarded as the last of its kind. According to industry observer Scott Fybush, the loss of WCTM and its format marked "(the end of) the era of commercial beautiful music on American radio".

Today, the station lives on as WEDI, simulcasting WBZI's programming. The old WCTM-FM tower, topped with the original call letters, still stands atop a building at 505 North Barron in downtown Eaton. After several years of deteriorating health following the sale of WCTM, Stan Corning died on December 24, 2010, at approximately 86 years old at his residence and is interred next to his wife Helen (who preceded him in death in 1989) at Sugar Grove Cemetery in West Alexandria, Ohio.

Tapes of WCTM, including its final day on the air, are known to exist in the aircheck collection of Clarke Ingram, a Pittsburgh radio executive who befriended Coning and was a fan of the station.

The WCTM callsign was later used briefly in 2011 at the former WSFO, a never-built construction permit for an FM station at 90.7 in Barrington, New Hampshire.

== See also ==
- WGTZ (originally WCTM-FM)
- WEDI (AM) (the current incarnation of AM 1130)
- Eaton, Ohio
- List of radio stations in Ohio
