= WNKR =

- Williamstown, Kentucky; United States
- Broadcast area: Cincinnati metropolitan area
- Frequency: 106.7 MHz
- Branding: WKRP The Oasis

Programming
- Format: Oldies
- Affiliations: Westwood One

Ownership
- Owner: Grant County Broadcasters, Inc.

History
- First air date: April 1, 1992
- Former frequencies: 106.5 MHz (1992–2008)
- Call sign meaning: "Northern Kentucky Radio"

Technical information
- Licensing authority: FCC
- Facility ID: 24817
- Class: A
- ERP: 1,800 watts
- HAAT: 185 meters (607 ft)
- Transmitter coordinates: 38°40′54″N 84°39′33″W
- Repeaters: 94.5 WOXY (Englewood, Ohio); 97.7 WKRP-FM (Mason, Ohio)

Links
- Public license information: Public file; LMS
- Webcast: Listen live
- Website: www.wherethemusicwent.com

WNKR (106.7 FM) is a commercial radio station licensed to Williamstown, Kentucky, and serving the Cincinnati metropolitan area. It airs an oldies format and has been owned since its inception by Grant County Broadcasters, Inc., an independent and local company.

WNKR has an effective radiated power (ERP) of 1,800 watts. The transmitter is off U.S. Route 25 in Dry Ridge, Kentucky. Programming is simulcast with WKRP-FM 97.7, licensed to Mason, Ohio.

== History ==
WNKR first signed on the air on April 1, 1992. It originally broadcast on 106.5, but in 2008, WNKR completed a signal upgrade, which included moving to 106.7 FM. WNKR had a locally programmed playlist of classic country from the 1970s, 1980s and 1990s, hosted by local air personalities. Local and Kentucky News Network news coverage were combined with local traffic and weather to create full-service programming in AM and PM drive times.

Kentucky Wildcats play-by-play sports and Rick Jackson's syndicated Country Classics program were heard on Saturday nights and Sunday mornings. For listeners located outside the range of its FM signal, WNKR streams all of its program content including play-by-play Wildcats sports broadcasts.

On October 2, 2017, WNKN (105.9 FM), licensed to Middletown, Ohio, was purchased by Grant County Broadcasters from Northern Kentucky University (NKU). It began broadcasting as a sister station to WNKR. This returned WNKN to the classic country format that was played on the station prior to its purchase by NKU in 2011 and extended WNKR's overall broadcast reach north to the Dayton metropolitan area. Both stations were branded as "Classic Country 105.9 & 106.7".

On July 12, 2022, Grant County Broadcasters broke the simulcast and flipped WNKN to adult hits, with WNKR retaining its classic country format.

On September 4, 2023, the station flipped to adult hits as "106.7 The Oasis", assuming the format of WNKN following its sale to Relevant Radio, a Catholic broadcaster.

On October 1, 2024, WNKR began simulcasting on WOXY (97.7 FM), licensed to Mason, Ohio. The stations were rebranded as "97.7/106.7 The Oasis". WYDB (Englewood, Ohio) was added to the simulcast on August 1, 2025.

On May 4, 2026, the "Oasis" brand was relaunched as "WKRP The Oasis" after operator Radioactive LLC, led by longtime media executive Randy Michaels, won the rights to use the WKRP call letters, and, as a tribute to sitcom WKRP in Cincinnati, chose to do so on the "Oasis" simulcast stations (as WOXY broadcast into the Cincinnati market). The call signs of WNKR's simulcast partners were realigned at that time.
