= WYDA =

Troy, Ohio; United States
- Broadcast area: Dayton
- Frequency: 96.9 MHz
- Branding: Air1

Programming
- Format: Christian worship
- Affiliations: Air1

Ownership
- Owner: Educational Media Foundation

History
- First air date: August 1991 (as WTRJ)
- Former call signs: WTRJ (1989–1996); WRNB (1996–2003); WOKL (2003–2012)

Technical information
- Licensing authority: FCC
- Facility ID: 69990
- Class: A
- ERP: 6,000 watts
- HAAT: 95.0 meters
- Transmitter coordinates: 40°01′41″N 84°11′28″W

Links
- Public license information: Public file; LMS
- Webcast: Listen Live
- Website: air1.com

WYDA (96.9 FM "Air1") is a radio station licensed to Troy, Ohio. The station airs the Christian worship formatted Air1 network programmed by the Educational Media Foundation. WYDA is broadcast to Dayton, its northern suburbs and the Upper Miami Valley region of Miami, Clark, Shelby, Champaign, Darke and surrounding counties in West Central Ohio with local offices are located on south Main in Dayton.

== History ==
Originally WTRJ, which first signed-on with Satellite Music Network programming in the summer of 1991, then later switching from Adult Contemporary to gospel music. It was purchased in 1996 by Dayton-based Hawes-Saunders Broadcasting becoming WRNB, which continued satellite programming services using ABC Radio's "Solid Gold Soul" format as a sister to WROU-FM "U-92" licensed to West Carrollton. WRNB also aired the Tom Joyner Morning Show from ABC Radio. Financial difficulties forced Hawes-Saunders to sell WROU to Radio One and the Troy station WRNB to EMF Broadcasting in 2003 now airing K-LOVE programming as WOKL.

In 2007, WOKL began low-power simulcasting on translators W231AZ 94.1 MHz northeast of Sidney, W244BR 96.7 in Springfield, and W269BP 101.7 MHz in Richmond, Indiana. (See complete list of translators below.)

K-LOVE programming is also heard on WKLN 102.3 in Wilmington (the former WSWO-FM) serving the south Dayton and northern Cincinnati suburbs as well as WNLT 104.3 licensed to Harrison serving Fairfield and metropolitan Cincinnati. In addition, WOAR 88.3 located in the eastern Clark County community of South Vienna(And a translator in the SW Clark County village of Enon at 103.3) aired K-LOVE programming, but has since switched and now airs Air One Christian programming for Springfield, London, Urbana, Mechanicsburg, Marysville and Grove City as well as Fairborn, Medway, Donnelsville, and Yellow Springs. WVSO was formerly an affiliate of American Family Radio.

The WSWO-LP calls have moved to a low power FM station in Huber Heights, Ohio with the WRNB calls transplanted to an FM station in the Philadelphia market which is also owned by Radio One.

== WOKL switches to Air 1 ==
According to posts on the Cincinnati boards at Radio Discussions dot com, WOKL switched affiliation from K-LOVE to Air 1 during the week of December 3, 2012. This move was made after the transmitting tower of 30,000-watt WKCD (formerly WCDR 90.3 MHz in Cedarville) was moved from Cedarville to a new site in Dayton. Up to this point, Air-1 programming was heard on an FM translator at 88.3 MHz in South Vienna in eastern Clark County, Ohio. It has been speculated that the current translators of WOKL would follow suit in broadcasting the programming of Air 1.

The WKCD (former WCDR) translator at 98.1 FM in Sidney has been sold to Muzzy Broadcasting, owners of WPTW in Piqua.

On December 3, 2012, the station changed its call sign to the current WYDA.

== Translators of WYDA ==
In addition to the main station, WYDA is relayed by an additional four translators to widen its broadcast area.

| Call sign | Frequency | City of license | FID | ERP (W) | Class | FCC info |
|---|---|---|---|---|---|---|
| W246CQ | 97.1 FM | Dayton, Ohio | 138918 | 10 | D | LMS |
| W277AO | 103.3 FM | Green Meadows, Ohio | 138923 | 19 | D | LMS |
| W231AZ | 94.1 FM | Sidney, Ohio | 138896 | 27 | D | LMS |
