= WSWO-LP =

Low-power FM station in Huber Heights, Ohio

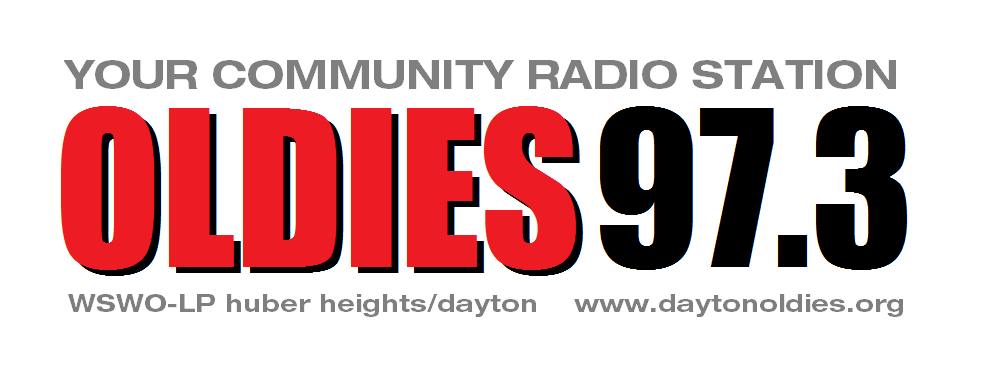
- Huber Heights, Ohio; United States
- Broadcast area: Dayton, Ohio
- Frequency: 97.3 MHz
- Branding: Oldies 97.3 ("97-three")

Programming
- Format: Oldies (1950s through 1970s)

Ownership
- Owner: Southwestern Ohio Public Radio

History
- First air date: September 2004 (as WOXR-LP)
- Former call signs: WOXR-LP (2004–2007)
- Former frequencies: 97.7 MHz (2004–2011); 97.5 MHz (2011–2013)
- Call sign meaning: Southwestern Ohio

Technical information
- Licensing authority: FCC
- Facility ID: 131375
- Class: L1
- ERP: 100 watts
- HAAT: 30 meters (98 ft)
- Transmitter coordinates: 39°49′32.10″N 84°08′59.40″W

Links
- Public license information: LMS
- Webcast: Listen Live
- Website: www.daytonoldies.org

WSWO-LP "Oldies 97.3" is a non-commercial low-power FM station at 97.3 MHz licensed to Southwestern Ohio Public Radio Inc. in Huber Heights, Ohio.

== Brief history ==
The station originally signed on as WOXR-LP in September 2004, switching to its current calls in January 2005. The WSWO calls were previously used in Wilmington, Ohio, at 102.3 FM (formerly WKFI, now WKLN, the K-LOVE affiliate for Wilmington, south Dayton, Middletown and Hamilton).

From 1968 to 1972, the WSWO calls were used by independent Channel 26 out of Springfield, Ohio (now WBDT, the Dayton affiliate of The CW).

== Oldies 97.3 ==
WSWO-LP is a non-commercial radio station relying solely on donations from listeners and local businesses to cover expenses for daily operations and music royalties. Accordingly, all persons involved in the station's programming and maintenance are unpaid volunteers. The station's format consists of oldies music (1950s through 1970s), but also airs syndicated and locally produced programs devoted to different genres of oldies, including pre-rock and roll era music. The station also prominently features coverage of Wayne High School sports, and occasionally broadcasts locally produced radio dramas, including a dramatized version of A Christmas Carol, which features several members of the air staff in the cast and has been an annual holiday presentation since it first aired in 2011.

Though non-commercial, the station broadcasts acknowledgments of local businesses who support the station, added to which community announcements are aired along with PAMS-style jingles for identification purposes.

== Facilities ==
WSWO-LP operates with a power of 100 watts. Its original transmitter (then at 97.7) was located on Lisa Drive. The station later moved its studios and transmitter to the Huber Centre, a shopping center at the intersection of Brandt Pike (aka SR 201) and Chambersburg Road, with the station's transmitter located behind the building.

=== Changes in frequency ===
The station originally used translator W268AX at 101.5 MHz from Old Troy Pike (SR 202) in north Dayton with a power of 106 watts which provided a wider coverage area reaching downtown Dayton, Moraine, Troy, and the fringe areas in Piqua to the north and Miamisburg to the south. The transition from 101.5 to 101.1 took place on Monday August 11, 2008. Both FMs served the area of north Dayton, Vandalia, Englewood and surrounding communities.

According to its website, the station's translator moved from 101.5 to 101.1 in August 2008 when the former WKSW "Kiss Country" (now WCLI) moved from 101.7 to the 101.5 frequency and switched its city of license from Urbana to Enon. The WSWO-LP translator was granted by the FCC earlier in the summer to move to 101.1 under the new callsign W266BG. As of September 2013, the 101.1 translator is no longer in use by the station; it is now being used by WZLR. Also WCWT in Centerville has been granted a construction permit to move to 107.3 MHz to accommodate the WKSW/WCLI move to 101.5 MHz. This move allowed better reception in the southern portion of Dayton as well as the Beavercreek area.

WSWO-LP's original frequency was located adjacent to 97.5 (currently used by WTGR licensed in Union City and originating in Greenville.) The 97.5 frequency was previously licensed in the Dayton area and was used in the 1950s for the fledgling but short-lived WLWB-FM, owned by Cincinnati-based Crosley Radio.

==== Move to 97.5 ====
A construction permit was granted by the FCC on November 23, 2011 to move WSWO-LP from 97.7 to 97.5. On-air testing began on November 30 from the new transmitter site located at the WSWO office and studio location. The move was meant to help resolve coverage problems, notably interference from WOXY which was formerly located in Oxford and is now in Mason. The official switchover from 97.7 to 97.5 took place on Saturday December 3, 2011. 97.7 is now unused in Dayton.

On January 25, 2013, WSWO-LP began streaming online at their new domain: www.daytonoldies.org

==== Move to 97.3 ====
Until October 4, 2013, WSWO-LP operated on the 97.5 frequency. On October 4, 2013, WSWO-LP moved to 97.3 FM, giving the station the ability to upgrade its signal and transmit from a higher tower. With the move, the station no longer needed the W266BG translator at 101.1 FM, which is owned by a separate entity; the translator is now being used by WZLR. The FCC frequency was licensed by the FCC on December 12, 2013.

== Current air staff (partial list) ==
- Tony Peters - Mondays 10am-2pm, and host of Sunday Night Music & Conversation, Sundays 9:30pm
- Panama Jack - Mondays 3-7pm
- Dr. Rock - Tuesdays 7-10am
- Jordan Kelly - Tuesdays 10am-2pm
- Blazin' Brad - Tuesdays 2-6pm
- "Gladgirl" Shelly, host of The Wax Carnival - Tuesdays 8-11pm
- Mike Reisz - Wednesdays 4-7pm
- Gene Charles, host of Blues Corner - Wednesday 7-10pm, Sports announcer
- Jerry G. Halasz - Thursdays 10am-2pm
- John Bennett - Thursdays 2-6pm
- "The Other" Chuck Berry - Thursdays 7-9pm
- Chris Poole - Fridays 10pm-1am
- Gary Quinn - Saturdays 1-6pm
- Kel Crum - Sundays Noon-3pm
- Steve "Raddy" Radcliffe - Sundays 6-9pm
- David "Dave B." Bernard - Sports Announcer
- Lincoln Schreiber - Sports Announcer
