= WKFI =

Simulcast of WBZI, Xenia, OH
- Wilmington, Ohio; United States
- Broadcast area: Dayton metropolitan area
- Frequency: 1090 kHz
- Branding: Real Roots Radio

Programming
- Language: English
- Format: Classic country
- Affiliations: Fox News Radio; Ohio News Network; United Stations Radio Networks; Ohio Ag Net; Brownfield Network

Ownership
- Owner: Town And Country Broadcasting, Inc.
- Sister stations: WBZI; WEDI

History
- First air date: December 5, 1964
- Former call signs: WMWM (1964–1974)
- Call sign meaning: "We Keep Farmers Informed"

Technical information
- Licensing authority: FCC
- Facility ID: 58371
- Class: D
- Power: 1,000 watts (days only)
- Transmitter coordinates: 39°26′12″N 83°51′21″W
- Translator: 106.7 W294CQ (Wilmington)

Links
- Public license information: Public file; LMS
- Webcast: Listen live; Listen live (via TuneIn)
- Website: realrootsradio.com

WKFI (1090 AM, "Real Roots Radio") is a commercial radio station licensed to Wilmington, Ohio, United States, and serving the eastern suburbs of the Dayton metropolitan area. Owned by Town And Country Broadcasting, Inc., the station carries a classic country format simulcast with WBZI (1500 AM) in Xenia. News updates are provided by Fox News Radio and the Ohio News Network.

WKFI broadcasts during the daytime hours only, but is relayed around the clock over low-power FM translator W294CQ (106.7 FM).

== History ==
On December 5, 1964, the station signed on as WMWM. In 1974, it switched its call sign to WKFI. Several formats over the years included middle of the road, country music with farm news and later southern gospel.

In 1968, an FM station was added as WKIT at 102.3 MHz. At first, the two stations simulcast their programming. Then briefly it took the WKFI call letters until the early 1970s when the call sign changed to WDHK with an adult contemporary format. That format remained throughout the 1970s and 1980s when the call sign was switched to WSWO-FM in 1982 and then playing new country in 1997. It became classic country in 2003 as a brief AM/FM simulcast of WBZI until WSWO-FM was sold to EMF Broadcasting becoming WKLN, the southwest Ohio repeater of K-Love, a national Christian contemporary format.

On March 23, 2018, WKFI rebranded as "Real Roots Radio".

== See also ==
- WBZI
- WEDI
