= WCLI-FM =

Radio station in Enon, Ohio

- Enon, Ohio; United States
- Broadcast area: Dayton, Ohio
- Frequency: 101.5 MHz
- Branding: 101.5 The Fridge

Programming
- Format: Alternative rock

Ownership
- Owner: Connoisseur Media; (Alpha Media Licensee LLC)
- Sister stations: WDHT; WGTZ; WING; WROU-FM

History
- First air date: August 1, 1965 (as WCOM at 101.7)
- Former call signs: WCOM (1965–1985); WKSW (1985–2011)
- Former frequencies: 101.7 MHz (1965–2011)

Technical information
- Licensing authority: FCC
- Facility ID: 10113
- Class: A
- ERP: 6,000 watts
- HAAT: 100 meters (330 ft)

Links
- Public license information: Public file; LMS
- Webcast: Listen live
- Website: www.1015thefridge.com

WCLI-FM (101.5 FM, "101.5 The Fridge") is a radio station licensed to Enon, Ohio. Owned by Connoisseur Media, it broadcasts an alternative rock format serving the Dayton metropolitan area.

Its studios are located in Kettering, Ohio (with a Dayton address) and its transmitter is in New Carlisle, Ohio, northeast of Dayton.

== History ==
=== Early years ===
The station began on August 1, 1965 on 101.7 MHz as WCOM, the name coming from the founder and original licensee, Champaign Communications, the DBA of parent company Brown Publishing, then the owners of the Urbana Daily Citizen newspaper. It aired a mix of beautiful music and traditional middle of the road throughout the 1960s and 1970s, when the station was managed by Jim Bissey. In the early 1970s, it became FM stereo to liken itself with WHIO-FM and WPTW-FM on 99.1 and 95.7 FM, respectively. Future WIZE DJ Bill Hart began his commercial radio career under Jim Bissey. The station actually programmed some Top 40 rock music at night until Hart graduated from then Urbana College. He was drafted and ended up on the Armed Forces Radio and Television Service in 1973. Religious programming was aired on Sunday evenings until a gradual format change to adult contemporary began in 1979. The station studios were located across the street from the downtown Chakeres Urbana cinema at 225 South Main Street (upstairs) in an old brick building that also housed a local printing business (downstairs). The building was razed in the 1990s after the studios and offices moved to Springfield.

=== WKSW ===
As the adult contemporary format came into being, a new image emerged with it along with a new owner, USA Broadcasting. The callsign changed in 1985 to WKSW as "Light Rock and Less Talk...Kiss FM". John Hall (previously with WIZE in Springfield) became its new morning personality and program director during this time. Later, after the format switch to country, Hall moved on to WLW in Cincinnati, WGRR in Hamilton, WBNS in Columbus, the former WCLR Piqua/WZLR Xenia "Oldies 95", and, finally, WULM, the former WBLY in Springfield, before his death in 2004.

=== Kiss Country ===
WKSW switched to a country music format in 1987 after a brief period with an adult contemporary format. After the transmitter had moved to Dallas Road east of U.S. Route 68 approximately halfway between Urbana and Springfield, the studios moved to Derr Road south of Villa Road on the north side of Springfield. The final afternoon personality and Program Director was Lee Riley, who was at WONE in Dayton during its country music years in the late 1970s and 1980s. Andy Lawrence, a fixture at the station since 1992, was the station's final morning show host and assistant program director.

WKSW-FM was the only commercial station still broadcasting in and for the Springfield and Urbana area. WULM now airs Catholic programming as part of Radio Maria USA, a repeater network originated by KJMJ in Alexandria, Louisiana. WIZE is a repeater of Dayton sports station WONE. WDHT is licensed to Urbana, but has their tower site located in Springfield. The city of license for WDHT changed with the WKSW move-in to comply with FCC rules.

=== Move to 101.5 FM ===
Radio One applied for a move of WKSW's frequency to 101.5 FM and its city of license to Enon prior to selling it to Main Line Broadcasting in 2007; the construction permit for that move, which allows the station to target the Dayton metropolitan area, was approved by the FCC. Through the middle of 2008, the 101.5 frequency had been used by W268AX, a translator of low-power WSWO-LP in Huber Heights. The WSWO-LP translator has moved to 101.1, causing WCWT-FM in Centerville to move to 107.3.

=== Click 101.5 ===
On March 25, 2011, at approximately 1:01 p.m., WKSW dropped its 23-year country format abruptly on 101.7 FM and went dark in the middle of Taylor Swift's "Back to December", and switched over to its new 101.5 FM signal. With the move, the station flipped to modern adult contemporary, branded as "Click 101.5". The first song heard on "Click" was "Sing" by My Chemical Romance. This put the station in competition up against hot adult contemporary station WMMX, CHR station WCHD and active rock station WXEG. It brought the alternative rock format back to Dayton when WXEG changed formats to active rock. On April 8, 2011, WKSW changed callsigns to WCLI-FM, to better reflect the "Click" branding.

=== 101.5 Hank FM ===
Logo as Hank FM, 2015-2025

On October 14, 2014, at 10 a.m., WCLI-FM began stunting with Christmas music, branded as "Santa 101.5". On October 16, WCLI-FM flipped to classic country, branded as "101.5 Hank FM".

=== 101.5 The Fridge ===
In September 2025, Connoisseur Media completed its merger with Alpha Media, taking over control of WCLI-FM in the process. Just after 5 p.m. on September 30, after playing "Hillbilly Rock" by Marty Stuart and "Rock Bottom" by Wynonna Judd (and near-concurrent with sister station WGTZ making such a move), WCLI-FM dropped the "Hank" format and began stunting with songs related to food or drink (for example, "Cherry Pie" by Warrant, "Tutti Frutti" by Little Richard, and "Chicken Fried" by the Zac Brown Band), promising that Dayton's "musical diet" would change at 5 p.m. on October 2.

At that time, the station flipped to a gold-leaning alternative rock format as "101.5 The Fridge, Dayton's Coolest Alternative", launching with "Welcome to the Black Parade" by My Chemical Romance. The name is a reference to the noted former Frigidaire manufacturing complex in downtown Dayton that had been abandoned since its closure in 2008.
