= WDHT =

Radio station in Urbana, Ohio

Coordinates: 39.953°N 83.869°W

- Urbana, Ohio; United States
- Broadcast area: Dayton, Ohio
- Frequency: 102.9 MHz
- Branding: Hot 102-9

Programming
- Format: Urban-leaning rhythmic contemporary
- Affiliations: Premiere Networks

Ownership
- Owner: Connoisseur Media; (Alpha Media Licensee LLC)
- Sister stations: WGTZ; WING; WCLI-FM; WROU-FM

History
- First air date: July 1958
- Former call signs: WBLY-FM (1958–1979); WAZU (1979–1995); WING-FM (1995–2001)
- Call sign meaning: Dayton Hot

Technical information
- Licensing authority: FCC
- Facility ID: 60252
- Class: B
- ERP: 50,000 watts
- HAAT: 150 meters (490 ft)

Links
- Public license information: Public file; LMS
- Webcast: Listen live
- Website: www.hot1029.com

WDHT (102.9 FM "Hot 102.9") is an urban-leaning rhythmic contemporary radio station in Urbana, Ohio serving the Dayton–Springfield area. WDHT is currently owned by Alpha Media, which also owns WING, WROU-FM, WCLI-FM and WGTZ. Its transmitter site on Miller Road in Springfield is shared with that of WULM, as this was previously the transmitting site of the former WBLY/WAZU. Its studios are in Kettering, Ohio.

== History ==
=== MOR (1958–1979) ===
Prior to becoming WDHT, the 102.9 frequency was originally licensed to Springfield, Ohio, as WBLY-FM from 1958 to 1979, simulcasting middle of the road-formatted WBLY (1600 AM).

=== Album rock (1979–1993) ===
"FM-103 The Zoo...from A to Z to U." and played album oriented rock and occasionally some adult contemporary. In the mid to late-80s, they simply billed themselves as "103 WAZU", and later as "102.9 WAZU". On January 15, 1989, the station briefly went dark, and when they returned to the airwaves later that day they had switched directions to album oriented rock and began billing themselves as "The Big WAZU", which lasted until March 19, 1993, by which time the station had evolved into harder-edged active rock. It competed fiercely with WTUE.

In 1992, WAZU was sold to Osborn Communications by "Smilin' Bob" Yountz's Champion City Broadcasting, owners of the former WBLY, and moved the studios to Dayton. WAZU's studios were originally located in its city of license of Springfield.

=== Classic rock (1993–2001) ===
On March 19, 1993, WAZU flipped their format to classic rock as "Classic Rock 102.9 WAZU", following a brief stunt as "102.9 WZEP-All Led Zeppelin, All The Time". Great Trails Broadcasting changed the station's call sign to WING-FM–matching its WING (1410 AM)–in May 1995 and continued the classic rock format. The WAZU calls moved to 107.1 FM, licensed to Circleville, south of Columbus, in late 1996. They also used the "Big WAZU" nickname and active rock format, as well as using exactly the same imaging as 102.9 did in early 1993.

=== Rhythmic (2001–present) ===
In 2001, Radio One acquired WING-FM and flipped it to rhythmic contemporary on August 3. The station changed call letters to WDHT on October 24 to match the "Hot" moniker. Two years later, Radio One bought out rival urban station WROU, which was Dayton's last locally owned FM radio station, and converted it to urban adult contemporary, a move that allowed WDHT to evolve into a mainstream urban direction, even though its presentation is more along the lines of that of a Churban-formatted station (like WPGC-FM in Washington, D.C.).

Under Radio One, WDHT was known for voice-tracking programming and repetition of songs in their playlists, which tends to favor Churban-friendly rhythmic hits, but following a series of ownership changes since 2007, it has taken on a more live and local presentation. Also, in the wake of Top 40 sister station WGTZ's flip to adult hits, it has also taken on a more broader rhythmic direction than ever, which might be due to the competition it has with rival Top 40 WDKF, whose direction leaned rhythmic. The station also aired the Russ Parr morning show, which was dropped in August 2014 in favor of "The Breakfast Club". By September 2009, WDHT was officially moved from the R&B/Hip-Hop panel to the Rhythmic Airplay Panel by Nielsen BDS as it began to incorporate more Rhythmic Pop tracks into its playlist. The move to rhythmic might have been spurred by WDKF's decision to shift away from a local presentation to adopting Clear Channel's Premium Choice presentation. That approach would result in WDKF being dropped from both Mediabase and BDS Top 40 reporting panels in 2009, only to be reinstated in 2013 when it began re-adding air staffers.

In 2006, Radio One announced that sister station WKSW would relocate its frequency from 101.7 to 101.5 and change its city of license from Urbana to Enon. The move was later approved by the Federal Communications Commission (FCC). As part of a trade off, WDHT switched its city of license from Springfield to Urbana in 2010, but the station's transmitter remained in Springfield after WKSW's move. This move was planned before Radio One sold its Dayton area cluster to Main Line.

On May 17, 2007, Philadelphia-based Main Line Broadcasting announced the acquisition of Radio One's stations in the Dayton and Louisville market areas. Main Line took over the Dayton stations on September 14, 2007. Main Line would be acquired by Alpha Media in 2014. Alpha Media merged with Connoisseur Media on September 4, 2025.
