= WROU-FM =

Radio station in West Carrollton, Ohio

Coordinates: 39.721°N 84.261°W

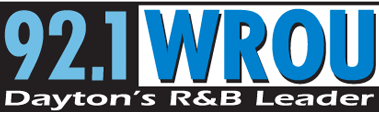
- West Carrollton, Ohio; United States
- Broadcast area: Dayton, Ohio
- Frequency: 92.1 MHz
- Branding: 92.1 WROU

Programming
- Format: Urban adult contemporary
- Affiliations: Premiere Networks

Ownership
- Owner: Connoisseur Media; (Alpha Media Licensee LLC)
- Sister stations: WDHT; WGTZ; WING; WCLI-FM

History
- First air date: 1991
- Former call signs: WROU (1990–2003); WRNB (2003–2004)
- Call sign meaning: "We Are Ohio's U-92" (former branding)

Technical information
- Licensing authority: FCC
- Facility ID: 26451
- Class: A
- ERP: 1,050 watts
- HAAT: 163 meters (535 ft)

Links
- Public license information: Public file; LMS
- Webcast: Listen live
- Website: www.921wrou.com

WROU-FM (92.1 MHz) is an urban adult contemporary radio station licensed to West Carrollton, Ohio, serving the Dayton area and owned and operated by Connoisseur Media. WROU is Dayton's affiliate of The Steve Harvey Morning Show. Its studios are located in Kettering, Ohio (with a Dayton address), and its transmitter is in west Dayton.

== History ==
WROU was founded by Ro Nita Hawes-Saunders, an educator and dancer who was once an on-air personality at WDAO, in 1991. At the start, it was a typical locally owned mainstream urban with live airstaffers until Radio One purchased the station in 2003, after several years of resisting offers to sell the outlet and to fight off bankruptcy. Since the sale of WROU Hawes-Saunders continued to work with the Dayton Contemporary Dance Company as its executive director and serves as a board member of Parents Advancing Choice in Education, Inc. (PACE), which was formed in 1998 to help assist families who seek to exercise education choice for their children while helping schools adopt strategies for improvement. Her life as a radio station owner was also profiled in 2009 in the syndicated television series "Lifestyles with Rebecca".

After Radio One took over the ownership of WROU, it adjusted the format to an urban AC presentation due to having WDHT (whose signal and coverage is much larger than WROU) taking the younger demos with its R&B/hip-hop heavy rhythmic product. WROU was briefly known as WRNB after the sale, but reverted to the original calls in 2004. WRNB was originally at 96.9 FM and licensed to Troy as satellite-formatted "Solid Gold Soul" and was at one time the sister station to WROU, which is now Air1 station WYDA. The WRNB calls are now used for Radio One's urban AC FM station in Philadelphia.

On May 17, 2007, Philadelphia-based Main Line Broadcasting announced the acquisition of Radio One's stations in the Dayton and Louisville market areas. Main Line took over the Dayton stations on September 14, 2007. Main Line would be acquired by Alpha Media in 2014. Alpha Media merged with Connoisseur Media on September 4, 2025.

== Previous notable on-air staff ==
- Stan "The Man" Boston (Dir. of Programming)
- Marco Simmons (Programmer)
- Ebony Foxx
- Bob Summers
- Lee Stephens (a.k.a. The Famous)
- L.A. Rene
- Ready Action (Music Director)
- Indigo Blue
- D.J. SKNO
- "The Professor" Chris Taylor
- Theo Smith
- Doug Davis (Double D)
