= WEDI (AM) =

Radio station in Eaton, Ohio

Simulcast of WBZI, Xenia
- Eaton, Ohio; United States
- Broadcast area: Preble County
- Frequency: 1130 kHz
- Branding: Real Roots Radio

Programming
- Language: English
- Format: Classic country
- Affiliations: Fox News Radio; Ohio News Network; United Stations Radio Networks; Ohio Ag Net; Brownfield Network

Ownership
- Owner: Town and Country Broadcasting, Inc.
- Sister stations: WBZI; WKFI

History
- First air date: August 1981
- Former call signs: WCTM (1981–2004)
- Call sign meaning: Eaton, Dayton, Indiana

Technical information
- Licensing authority: FCC
- Facility ID: 71930
- Class: D
- Power: 250 watts day
- Transmitter coordinates: 39°44′55″N 84°35′02″W
- Translator: 105.5 W288DJ (Eaton)

Links
- Public license information: Public file; LMS
- Webcast: Listen live; Listen live (via TuneIn)
- Website: realrootsradio.com

WEDI (1130 kHz "Real Roots Radio") is a daytime-only commercial AM radio station, licensed to Eaton, Ohio.

== History ==
WEDI began in 1981 as WCTM, a continuation of a beautiful music format which aired originally at 92.9 FM (the present-day WGTZ) where the WCTM calls originated in 1959. In June 2004, while battling with health problems and age, Stanley Coning, the owner, operator, chief engineer and announcer of "Radio Ranch 1130 WCTM", announced his official retirement from radio broadcasting and bid farewell to his many listeners. Stanley Coning died on Christmas Eve, December 24, 2010, at his Eaton residence and is buried with his wife Helen in neighboring West Alexandria.

The transmitter site and three towers (home built by Coning himself) remain located in the Preble County rural community of Glenwood, just east of Eaton. Its "figure 8" east to west directional pattern allows the station to be heard as far west as Greenfield in Central Indiana, as well as in London, Ohio.

The Brownfield Network was carried by the former WCTM throughout the 1980s and 1990s. Since the purchase of the Eaton AM outlet, WEDI (through originator WBZI) revived the WCTM tradition serving its eastern Indiana listeners airing Brownfield Network programming in addition to the Ohio Ag Net (the direct descendant of the original ABN) for Ohio farmers.

== Classic Country Radio ==
The station returned to the air in July 2004 as WEDI, now owned by Town and Country Broadcasting. Its current format, "Classic Country Radio", consists of country oldies from the 1950s up to the 1980s as well as bluegrass and country gospel music. The station is the Western Ohio/Eastern Indiana repeater of WBZI in Xenia, Ohio, which serves Xenia, Springfield, eastern Dayton and surrounding areas. WKFI in Wilmington is the other repeater, serving southwestern Ohio and portions of Northern Kentucky as well as metropolitan Cincinnati.

== Real Roots Radio ==
On March 23, 2018, WEDI rebranded as "Real Roots Radio".

WEDI is simulcast on 105.5 FM (translator W288DJ) also in Eaton.

The call sign WEDI had once been assigned to the passenger liner SS America of the United States Lines.

== See also ==
- WCTM
- WGTZ
- WBZI
