= WING =

Radio station in Dayton, Ohio

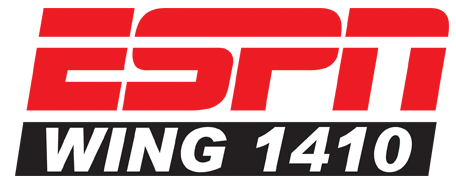
- Dayton, Ohio; United States
- Broadcast area: Dayton metropolitan area
- Frequency: 1410 kHz
- Branding: ESPN WING 1410 AM

Programming
- Language: English
- Format: Sports radio
- Network: ESPN Radio
- Affiliations: Cincinnati Reds; Columbus Blue Jackets; Ohio State Sports Network

Ownership
- Owner: Connoisseur Media; (Alpha Media Licensee LLC)
- Sister stations: WDHT; WGTZ; WCLI-FM; WROU-FM

History
- First air date: June 4, 1924 (Note: Due to a typographical error, some later sources incorrectly list the station's first airdate as "May 24, 1921", which is actually exactly three years before the actual date of the station's initial test transmission as reported by Stanley Krohn. This incorrect year appears in the May 1962 issue of Broadcasting magazine ("Radio stations 40 or more years old in 1962" ("WING Dayton, Ohio" entry), Broadcasting, May 14, 1962, page 132.) However, on May 2, 1929, reflecting its actual establishment in 1924, it was reported that the station, now WSMK, was in the process of celebrating its fifth anniversary. The 1962 Broadcasting magazine entry also makes an erroneous reference to the supposed initial use of the call letters "WXAX", which was not actually assigned to any stations at this time.)
- Former call signs: WDBS (1924–1925); WSMK (1925–1939)
- Call sign meaning: In honor of Dayton's history as the birthplace of aviation

Technical information
- Licensing authority: FCC
- Facility ID: 25039
- Class: B
- Power: 5,000 watts
- Transmitter coordinates: 39°40′56.2″N 84°9′32.8″W

Links
- Public license information: Public file; LMS
- Webcast: Listen live; Listen live (via Audacy); Listen live (via iHeartRadio)
- Website: www.wingam.com

WING (1410 kHz) is a commercial AM radio station in Dayton, Ohio, operating with 5,000 watts along with studios, offices and transmitter located on David Road in Kettering. It is the first (and oldest) full-time commercial radio station in Dayton. It is the local affiliate for ESPN Radio and the Ohio State Sports Network, but is best known and remembered as Dayton's first Top 40-formatted station.

WING operates at 5,000 watts around the clock. A single tower is used during the day, providing at least secondary coverage to most of southwestern Ohio. At night, two towers are used in a directional pattern, concentrating the signal around Dayton.

== Programming ==
=== Sports play-by-play ===
- Dayton affiliate for:
  - Ohio State Buckeyes football and men's basketball
  - Cincinnati Reds
  - Columbus Blue Jackets

== Early history ==
WING was first licensed on May 31, 1924, as WDBS to the S.M.K. Radio Corporation at 39 East Third Street in Dayton, Ohio. After a short period of testing, it made its formal debut broadcast on the evening of June 4, 1924.

The station's call letters were randomly assigned by the Department of Commerce from an alphabetical list, and Stanley M. Khron, Jr., owner of the S.M.K. Radio Corporation, adopted "Watch Dayton's Broadcasting Station" as a slogan that reflected the call sign. The call letters were changed to WSMK in early 1925 to match Khron's initials. It also upgraded its power to one thousand watts that same year. Programming hours were sporadic and operated on several different frequencies.

Following the establishment of the Federal Radio Commission (FRC), stations were initially issued a series of temporary authorizations starting on May 3, 1927. In addition, they were informed that if they wanted to continue operating, they needed to file a formal license application by January 15, 1928, as the first step in determining whether they met the new "public interest, convenience, or necessity" standard. On May 25, 1928, the FRC issued General Order 32, which notified 164 stations, including WSMK, that "From an examination of your application for future license it does not find that public interest, convenience, or necessity would be served by granting it." However, the station successfully convinced the commission that it should remain licensed. On November 11, 1928, the FRC implemented a major reallocation of station transmitting frequencies, as part of a reorganization resulting from its implementation of General Order 40. WSMK was assigned to 570 kHz.

The first studio was located in the former Beckel House Hotel on East Third Street in downtown Dayton. Actor/dancer/singer/musician Scatman Crothers got his start at the station during the WSMK era in 1932. Another ownership change took place in 1939 when Cincinnati businessman Charles Sawyer bought the station from Krohn and switching the calls, at the suggestion of Jack Snow, to WING to become synonymous with Dayton's aviation history. It then moved to the second floor above the Loews Theater also located downtown at 125 North Main Street (demolished in 1975) where it remained until 1960. It was that same year when WING was granted by the Federal Communications Commission (FCC) to upgrade its power to 5,000 watts and to construct a new transmitter site on David Road in Kettering.

== "High Flying" WING ==
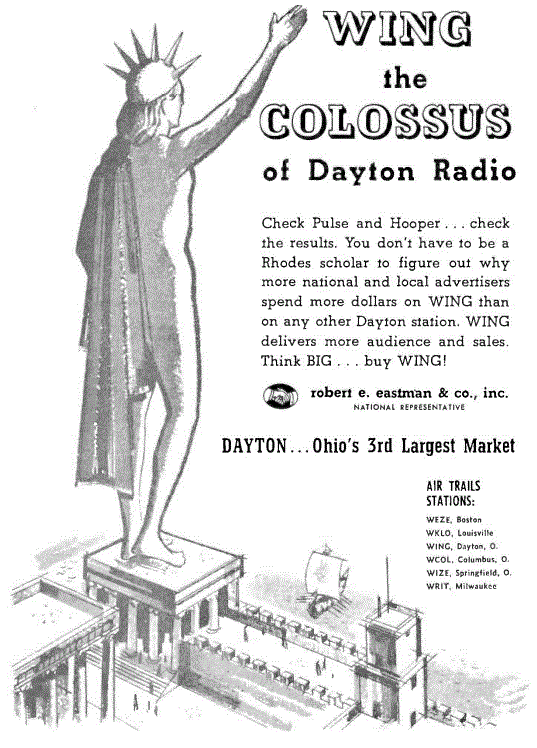
Station advertisement (1963)

It was in the 1940s during the big band era and later with the advent of R&B-combined rock n' roll in the 1950s when WING became Dayton's original hit music station. Charlie Reeder, inducted into the Dayton Broadcasters Hall of Fame in 2007 was one of its first morning personalities during this era with his program "Sunny Side Up". Local DJ legend Gene "By Golly" Barry came on board with the evening program "Swingin' With Wing" and became a staple there from that point up through the 1960s when WING (then, owned by Dayton-based Air Trails Broadcasting, later Great Trails Broadcasting) became Dayton's first official Top 40 station. It was also the chain's flagship station. Its sister stations included WIZE in Springfield and WCOL in Columbus which all had the same format at that time as well. During this time a downtown studio with a showcase window was opened in 1960 at 128 West First Street in the Talbott Tower building, which became the affectionately nicknamed "WING Island".

A weekly "super hot hits" survey was issued regularly to record shops and other retailers across the Miami Valley. With that, the format was tightened with a stable of personalities who became known as WING's "Lively Guys" (possibly inspired by WSAI's "Good Guys" in Cincinnati) which included Barry along with such personalities over the years as Lou Swanson, Jerry Kaye, Ken Warren, Big Jim Quinn, Dave Parks, Al Morgan (the former morning disk jockey from WTUE), Goldie, Bob Holiday, Ritchie "Duke of Dayton" Allen, Jerry "Big D" Dennis, Don Robertson, Dan Clover, John Alexander, Alan Sakalas (aka 'Mel Waukee') production and part-time Lively Guy, Mike Duff, all nights, weekends and music director, Chuck McKibben who later worked as a producer for Mel Blanc in Hollywood, WING radio news staff was headed by National Broadcasters Hall Of Fame inductee Rod Williams who won numerous awards including a commendation from the Ohio General Assembly for his combat reporting in Vietnam.

Jack Wymer "Dayton's Man On The Street", among countless others and a young Johnny Walker who came to WING by way of sister station WIZE who later moved to WKEF in 1970.

Wolfman Jack was aired late at night in syndicated form in the 1970s.

Aside from Gene "By Golly" Barry, the "lively guy" who enjoyed the most extended stay from 1967 to 1992 was morning man Steve Kirk (formerly from Cincinnati's WSAI) known for his telephone "put-ons" and other screwball on-air gags and drop-ins from 1966 until the late 1980s. He was equally known for his on-air self-introduction: "Hi-ya gang...Kirkie here...ha-chi-chi-chi-chi-chi!"

WING's news department was also legendary with Jim Briggs, George Wymer (Jack's son), G. Paul Tantum, Terry Lafferty, Doug Ritter (Doug Ritterling, who began his WING newscasting career at 17 years of age, then became a disc jockey at sister stations WCOL and WXGT in Columbus), Randall Carlisle (who later gained fame as a sensational newscaster at CKLW), Mark Greco (Mark Giangreco, who later became a sportscaster on NBC), Bill Nance, Roy Dittman, Dave Thomas (who also worked at sister stations WCOL-FM in Columbus, and WJAI in Eaton, and later became an award-winning broadcaster in Colorado), Kathy O' Connor (Dayton's first female news reporter) and Retha Phillips among others. Nance and Phillips were also 2007 inductees into the Dayton Broadcasters Hall of Fame. In the early 1960s it was at first a top of the hour "rip and read" newscast from wire services with an echoed voice shouting the dateline location at the beginning of a story (replaced in 1965 by a tone chord simulating an electronic telegraph key sounder). The newscast was also upgraded by world news actualities from Metromedia Radio, a predecessor of UPI Audio Network who bought the news-feed service in 1971. By 1968, it switched to the Drake-inspired "20-20" News (aired at 20 minutes before and after the hour) with expanded local news coverage. Top of the hour news returned in 1980 from ABC Radio's American Information Network followed by a local newscast and weather without the catchy elements of the 1960s.

"High Flying WING" was the theme of a high energy upbeat jingle package in the mid-1960s produced by PAMS Productions in Dallas. In the early 1970s, the famous Drake "rum-pum" Boss Radio jingles featuring the Johnny Mann Singers were used, the same package used by then-legendary CKLW in Windsor, Ontario during the late 1960s and 1970s.

== Adult Radio 1410 WING ==
In the mid-1970s FM rock stations started to chip away at AM radio's Top 40 audiences. During this transitional time, WING began to soften its format to adult contemporary as "Adult Radio 1410". "Kirkie" continued his morning show (followed by John Alexander on mid-days) with the addition of John King and Terry Dorsey doing afternoons. The highly popular mock ads and comedy sketches of the fictitious Babs Knieiven's Bar and Grill of New Carlisle, Hiney Wine and a comedic spoof on current events called "The King and Dorsey Report" kept its fans laughing and listening, even with the 1980s onslaught of FM competitors WTUE and WDJX in nearby Xenia (now WZDA licensed to Beavercreek). It was also during this time when Great Trails decided to acquire an FM sister station for the now declining WING, in so doing purchased the original WCTM-FM in nearby Eaton from Stanley Coning renaming it WJAI with the branding "WJ-93" (inspired by the Florida sport known as Jai-Alai) at first continuing WCTM's beautiful music until 1979 when it switched to country (later big band/nostalgia) and adding one of its first female on-air personalities Kim Faris. Faris was soon followed by Nancy Cartwright, who would go on to have a successful voiceover career.

Jingles on WING during the 1970s and 1980s included PAMS' "Energy One" and "Music and More" TM's "You", and several jingle series from JAM Creative Productions, including "I'd Rather Be...", "The Best Show", "The Best Show 2" and "Good Time Radio". It was also during this time that the station aired American Top 40.

== End of an era ==
WING in the 1980s and 1990s showed more signs of listener burnout as even more listeners switched to FM. "Adult Radio 1410" added a supplemental tagline "Your Fun Oldies Station" with its vast record and jingle library featuring "The Sixties at 6" with King and Dorsey. An on-air reunion of the original WING Lively Guys took place in 1985.

Eventually its Top 40 format was moved to its Eaton FM sister re-branded in 1984 as WGTZ "Z-93" and with it John King moving to mornings with Terry Dorsey on a tape-delayed basis from a station in Texas where he was working at the time. Kim Faris, already there since the WJAI days stayed there doing mid-days and later as a morning sidekick to Jeff Wicker. Faris occasionally did late evenings at WING in the mid-1980s as well. Carl Day did afternoon drive for a period of time after John King moved to mornings at Z-93.

WING was a live oldies station from around 1985 to October 1990 when the station switched to a satellite oldies format during daytime hours after Kirkie's morning show. Prior to that time, a talk program with Stacy Taylor was added to the early evening shift with Mutual's Larry King Show from midnight to 6am. After Steve Kirk's departure for a brief gig at Beavercreek's WYMJ-FM "Oldies 104" he retired and eventually moved to Florida. WING's "High Flying" era was now a thing of the past. Owner Great Trails Broadcasting sent WING Program Director Rob Ellis and DJ Jason Roberts (who also had been an evening personality for a time on WGTZ) to Columbus's WCOL-FM to institute an oldies format there. WCOL-FM remained oldies until its purchase from Great Trails by Nationwide Communications.

In the fall of 2006, former newsman Bill Nance (now with Faith And Friends Radio) and Z-93's Kim Faris (now with FM competitor WYDB) organized a reunion party of WING's past and present air personalities at the Holiday Inn near Dayton Mall with a special memorial tribute to Gene "By Golly" Barry who died in 2001.

== Later years ==
After a stint as a CNN Radio affiliate in the 1990s and various network talk programs, it found its new niche in sports talk as a competitor to WONE (which it also competed with in the 1960s for its Top 40 audience.) WING now airs the programming of ESPN Radio in addition to serving as the Dayton affiliate for Ohio State Buckeyes football and basketball.

WING was owned by Radio One which acquired its previous owner, Cincinnati-based Blue Chip Broadcasting, in 1999. On May 17, 2007, Philadelphia-based Main Line Broadcasting announced the acquisition of Radio One's stations in the Dayton and Louisville market areas. Main Line took over the Dayton stations on September 14, 2007. Main Line Broadcasting was acquired by Alpha Media in 2014. Alpha Media merged with Connoisseur Media on September 4, 2025.

The program director of WING was Mark Neal who held that position from April 2006 to January 2018. The current Program Director is Justin Kinner who has held that position since February 2018. Kinner hosts The Justin Kinner Show, the station's afternoon drive time program. Other local shows include Sunday Morning Tailgate, hosted by Justin Kinner and Keith Byars, on Sunday mornings and The Keith Byars Show, which airs on Mondays.

== See also ==
- ESPN
- ESPN Radio
- WROU-FM
- WGTZ
- WDHT
- WCLI-FM
