= WGTZ =

Radio station in Eaton, Ohio

- Eaton, Ohio; United States
- Broadcast area: Dayton metropolitan area; Springfield metropolitan area
- Frequency: 92.9 MHz
- Branding: Z-93

Programming
- Language: English
- Format: Classic hits
- Affiliations: Compass Media Networks; Ohio State Sports Network

Ownership
- Owner: Connoisseur Media; (Alpha Media Licensee LLC)
- Sister stations: WCLI-FM; WDHT; WING; WROU-FM

History
- First air date: November 28, 1960
- Former call signs: WCTM-FM (1959–1972); WJAI (1972–1984)
- Call sign meaning: "Great Trails' Z-93" (former ownership)

Technical information
- Licensing authority: FCC
- Facility ID: 25043
- Class: B
- ERP: 40,000 watts
- HAAT: 168 meters (551 ft)
- Transmitter coordinates: 39.836°N 84.404°W

Links
- Public license information: Public file; LMS
- Webcast: Listen live; Listen live (via iHeartRadio)
- Website: www.z93dayton.com

WGTZ (92.9 MHz) is a commercial FM radio station licensed to Eaton, Ohio and serving the Dayton metropolitan area and Springfield metropolitan area radio market. It is owned by Connoisseur Media with studios in Kettering, Ohio (using a Dayton address).

WGTZ has an effective radiated power (ERP) of 40,000 watts. The transmitter is on Carr Drive near Albert Road in Brookville, Ohio.

== History ==
=== MOR (1959–1972) ===
The station signed on the air on November 28, 1960. It was founded as WCTM-FM by Stanley Coning and three other business partners, using the name Western Ohio Broadcasting Service Inc. WCTM-FM aired a middle of the road (MOR) sound in the beginning, featuring such artists as Frank Sinatra, Nat King Cole and Patti Page. Its original FM tower still stands today on North Barron Street in downtown Eaton near the Norfolk Southern Railway crossing with the original call letters still intact. WCTM-FM had a signal that did not reach Dayton originally. It was powered at 20,000 watts, with a 120 feet (37 m) antenna.

In the 1960s, Coning was locked out of the station in an attempt by his partners to take over the operation. The case was taken to court. Coning won and became the sole owner. He originally wanted an AM station at first, but was unable to obtain an AM license at the time, so he went for the FM construction permit, granted in 1959. A serious heart attack in the early 1970s forced him to put the station up for sale. At the same time, Great Trails Broadcasting was looking to acquire an FM station as a sister for its Dayton AM station WING when no more new commercial FM frequencies in Dayton were available. WCTM-FM was the logical choice. Coning sold the station and eventually was granted an AM frequency several years after his health improved. WCTM (1130 AM) was on the air from 1981 until 2004, when he retired and sold the station due to failing health and age. That station is now WEDI, a simulcast of classic country station WBZI in Xenia.

=== Easy listening (1972–1979) ===
After the station was acquired, the call letters were changed to WJAI (for Jai Alai, a popular betting game in Florida). Great Trails' purchase of the station did not include the existing studio. Stan Coning obliged by constructing a temporary studio in the basement of his home in Eaton. The quirky studio consisted of a rack along the left wall with aged broadcasting gear, an ancient Gates "Yard" audio board in front, a washer/dryer and toilet along the back wall. Access to the basement studio was through a windowed sliding door. WJAI-FM remained at this location for nearly three years. Coning was employed as the on-site engineer.

Program director John Robertson rarely visited the studios, remaining at the WING studios in Dayton. Robertson was a former WING on-air personality, promoted to managing the FM station and its largely automated format. Robertson hired Doug Ritter (Doug Ritterling) as one of WJAI's first announcers. Ritter was only 16 years of age. Ritter later became a newscaster at WING. Great Trails' purchase of WJAI was motivated by a possibility of a transmitter power increase, and access to the much larger Dayton market. The power increase was finally approved by the FCC after a prolonged legal battle with owners of two Dayton stations. The owners of those stations protested establishment of a new competing station in the Dayton market.

WJAI's first "official" studios were moved to a movie theater which had been converted to an office building at the corner of Somers and North Barron streets in downtown Eaton.

=== Country (1979–1982) ===
The beautiful music continued under the new nickname "WJ-93". Then in 1979, it switched to country music. That gave competition to WONE in Dayton and WBZI in Xenia (then at 95.3 FM). By this time, Kim Faris was hosting middays as one of the first women DJs in the Dayton market. She was joined by afternoon personality Ron Scott. Doug Davisson did the 7 to midnight shift after leaving WONE in the early 1980s.

The studios in 1986 moved to its current location at 717 E. David Road. The station joined its sister station WING.

=== Adult standards (1982–1984) ===
In 1982, the nationally syndicated "Music Of Your Life" service was heard on 92.9. It was an adult standards format playing hits from the 1940s, 1950s and 1960s. Music of Your Life was gaining a following on stations in Indianapolis, Chicago and other markets. WJAI did its own take on the format, supplementing the Music of Your Life tapes with its own musical selections. The format ran until 1984.

=== Top 40 (1984–2007) ===
The Z-93 nickname has been used by several hit music stations in other radio market areas. So Great Trails gave the nickname a try. In the 1980s, young people listening to contemporary hit music were switching from AM stations to FM stereo outlets. Great Trails decided to move WING's Top 40 format to its FM station at 92.9 MHz.

On March 25, 1984, at noon, Great Trails Broadcasting flipped WJAI to the new call sign WGTZ, as Z-93. The first song on the station was "Eat It!" by "Weird" Al Yankovic. That kicked off 10,093 songs in a row without commercial interruption.

The catchy legal ID was "WGTZ Eaton, Dayton And Springfield alive!" It first caught the attention of listeners that same year when there was no contemporary hit radio (CHR/Top 40) station in Dayton at the time. The phrase was coined by Z-93 creator/PD/Morning DJ John King as an attempt to position Z-93 as a Dayton station and minimize its Eaton location. This was when the transmitter was located in the city of Eaton, before the transmitter was relocated to Brookville the following year. With WGTZ playing Top 40 hits, WING switched to adult contemporary mixed with oldies. Meanwhile, the former WDJX in Xenia (transplanted to Beavercreek as WYMJ "Majic 104", later "Oldies 104") followed suit. Former album rock station 99.9 WVUD, then owned by the University of Dayton, tried its hand at the CHR/Pop format for a brief time. However, the station was later sold to commercial broadcasters and became soft AC station WLQT "Lite 100", and later, "Lite 99.9" under its new owners.

=== Logo and contests ===
The station's branding initially consisted of the text "Z-93" in block letters with a drop shadow. This logo was often displayed adjacent to the Coca-Cola company's "Enjoy Coke" logo in a co-branding campaign. In late 1984 and early 1985, bumper stickers bearing this logo pairing were widely distributed. It was part of a contest where listeners were eligible to win a 1985 Chevy IROC-Z if they sent in a registration form and displayed the Z-93 bumper sticker on their car.

In 1990, the station switched to a different logo with the "Z-93" underlined and written in a graffiti-like, scrawled style, with red lettering underlined with black lettering over a yellow background making up the Z-93 portion of the logo, and the WGTZ 92.9 FM call sign and frequency displayed in a red line underneath the Z-93 logo in yellow letters. At this time, Z-93 also sold T-shirts and other merchandise featuring the new logo at Dayton/Springfield area JCPenney stores for a period of a year or so.

Great Trails also owned WCOL and WCOL-FM in Columbus. WCOL was Columbus' heritage Top 40 station through the 1960s and 1970s. It appears in a scene in the Tom Hanks movie "That Thing You Do", released in 1996. WCOL-FM played album-oriented rock music. Largely because of the decline of AM radio, Great Trails abandoned Top 40 music on its AM station and moved it to its FM signal. WCOL-FM changed its call letters to WXGT and became more commonly known as 92X, Columbus' first contemporary hit radio station. It was largely due to the success of 92X that Great Trails made the decision to bring the format to Dayton. WXGT and WGTZ were virtual clones, using similar playlists, imaging, personalities, jingles and even station logos.

WGTZ's studios are located at 717 E. David Road in Kettering, the same location as its AM sister WING. Its transmitter moved in 1985 to Brookville between Eaton and Englewood, where it broadcasts at 40,000 watts. It currently shares its studios with WDHT, WROU-FM, and WCLI-FM.

Throughout the 2000s, WGTZ repeatedly jabbed at what was then known as WDKF for not having local DJs or contests with local winners and being controlled by Clear Channel Communications’ corporate operations. WDKF responded with similar messaging on its own station.

On May 17, 2007, Philadelphia-based Main Line Broadcasting announced the acquisition of Radio One's stations in the Dayton and Louisville market areas. Main Line took over the Dayton stations on September 14, 2007.

=== Z-93 morning shows ===
John King and Terry Dorsey (who originally broadcast afternoons at WING) came to Z-93 in 1984 as the first "Morning Crew" for a year. King was also PD of Z-93 during this time. They were followed by "Dr. Dave" Gross and "Wild Bill" taking the reins from March 1985 until September 4, 1987, when it became known as simply The Z Morning Zoo. During their first ratings sweep, "Dr. Dave" and "Wild Bill" doubled the morning show's Arbitron ratings, and within one year became the first morning show in Dayton radio to unseat the #1 ranked WHIO morning show (hosted by the legendary Lou Emm for over 40 consecutive years). Alan Kaye replaced Wild Bill as Dr. Dave's side-kick on September 7, 1987. Dr. Dave would leave in March 1990, replaced briefly by Humble Billy Hayes.

In June 1990, night jock Joe Mama replaced Hayes. Todd Hollst, who was doing overnights, began producing comedy bits & doing stunts for the show. In March 1991, Alan Kaye would be fired under controversy by GM David Macejko, which would result in a later lawsuit from Kaye, which he would win. Joe Mama's new co-host was Sandy Donovan.

In March 1992, Jeff Wicker was hired as the new Z-93 Morning Show host under PD Kevin Kenney, and Mama and Donovan were fired, and the Z Morning Zoo name was permanently retired. Kim Faris, who had been doing news at the station since Marita Matray departed in 1990, was named Wicker's new co-host, along with Producer Dave. Booger Johnson would later replace Dave in 1995 as Morning Show Producer. Wicker left the station in August 1995, replaced briefly by "The Hawkman", and then he was permanently replaced by Jack Pohl, with the morning show being called simply "Jack and Kim in the Morning", with future Z-93 morning host Scott Mallory becoming Morning Show Producer.

After Pohl left to take the position of Sports Director at local TV station WDTN-TV in 1997, he was replaced briefly by former 92X evening host Suzy Waud. Upon her departure, Chadow briefly hosted mornings. He would be replaced by comedians Rob Haney and Chili Challis, who along with Kim Faris and Producer Scott Mallory would be referred to as "The Z-93 Morning Show". Mallory left Z-93 in Fall 1997 for Alternative WXEG, where he would host afternoons and mornings before returning to Z-93 as Morning host in 2003. Haney left WGTZ in March 1998, and was replaced by long-time afternoon drive host Sean Roberts. Challis would leave in mid-1998. Roberts left Z-93 in mid-June 1999 after 7 1/2 years combined between hosting afternoons and mornings, making Sean one of Z-93's longest-tenured "Zeejays" in the history of Z-93.

After two months of Scott Sharp subbing, along with Angie J. and Kim and Morning Show Producer Mike D., Jim Wheeler was hired in August 1999, and the show would now be known as "Jim and Kim in the Morning". Campy moved over to Z-93 after sister station 102.9 WING-FM changed formats from Classic rock to CHR/Rhythmic as WDHT Hot 102.9 in August 2001 and became the third host, along with Jim and Kim, and the show became known as "Z-93 Mornings with Jim, Kim, and Campy". Wheeler would appear sporadically from September 2001-March 2002, with Kim and Campy referring to Jim as being on "special assignment". When Wheeler left in mid-March 2002, the show going forward was known as "The Morning Z with Kim and Campy".

Faris was moved to middays in August 2002, leaving Campy solo in the morning as a search for a new morning host was underway. Scott Mallory was eventually hired and debuted on Monday, March 17, 2003, and the show would be known until the end of Z-93 (on November 1, 2007) as "The Morning Z with Mallory and Campy". Kim Faris stayed on at the station doing mid-days until the end of 2006 when she was inducted into the Ohio Broadcasters Hall Of Fame. She announced her departure from the Z-93 air staff in December of that year and thanked her many fans who sent in countless letters and e-mails thanking her for a job well done. In 2007, Faris was also inducted into the Dayton Area Broadcasters Hall of Fame. She was joined by fellow broadcasters from WING's hit music era including Kathy O'Conner Bow, Charlie Reeder, Bill Nance and Reetha Phillips. Faris returned to the air in the summer of 2007 as the morning personality of competitor WLQT 94.5 Lite FM, where she remains on-air today as the morning host.

=== Adult hits (2007–2015) ===
On November 1, 2007, "Z-93" came to an end with "Good Riddance (Time of Your Life)" by Green Day, followed by an announcement that Z-93 would be changing formats the following day. The station then began stunting with an electronic countdown. All "Z-93" jocks were either let go or reassigned within the Main Line/Dayton cluster.

According to the Dayton Daily News on November 2, Z-93 was expected to switch to a variety hits format as "92-9 Jack FM", according to Radio Online. At noon that day, "FLY 92-9" debuted with an adult hits format and the tag line "We Play Anything". The first three songs played were The Steve Miller Band's "Fly Like An Eagle", Sugar Ray's "Someday", and Bryan Adams' "Summer of '69".

Main Line Broadcasting was acquired by Alpha Media in 2014.

=== Soft rock (2015–2017) ===
On February 27, 2015, at 3 p.m., WGTZ flipped to adult contemporary as "Soft Rock 92.9". The final song on "Fly" was "Time for Me to Fly" by REO Speedwagon. The first song on "Soft Rock" was Starship's "Nothing's Gonna Stop Us Now".

WGTZ incorporated elements of the previous format including some of the old station's playlist. However, the format failed to make much traction in the market, holding a 2.7 in the Spring 2017 Nielsen ratings, the last under the format.

=== Back to adult hits (2017–2025) ===
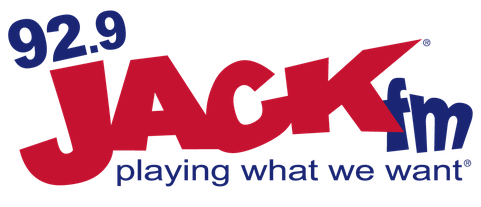
Logo as Jack FM

On September 1, 2017, at 5 p.m., after again playing "Good Riddance (Time of Your Life)", WGTZ flipped back to adult hits as "92.9 Jack FM", the name rumored to be used 10 years prior with the initial flip. It was one of several flips to the Jack FM format that Alpha Media planned across the country.

The first song on "Jack" was "Hey Ya!" by OutKast. As with most stations running the Jack-FM format, no DJs were used. A voice calling itself "Jack" makes all the station announcements and quips between songs.

=== Return of Z-93 (2025-) ===
On September 4, 2025, Alpha Media was acquired by Connoisseur Media.

On September 30, at 5 p.m., after signing off the Jack FM format with a half hour of departure-themed songs ending with "Goodbye to You" by Scandal, WGTZ began stunting with a loop of "Hit the Road, Jack" by Ray Charles, interspersed with sweepers promoting a relaunch on October 2 at 5 p.m. During this period, the station's website was replaced with Dayton Geographic—a parody of the magazine National Geographic—which contained an article teasing the rebrand by mentioning that a "zebra migration" would be occurring the same day.

At the promised time, following a montage paying tribute to the station's history, WGTZ flipped to classic hits and revived its heritage Z-93 branding. Program director Joel Murphy stated that the station's format would focus on pop hits from the 1980s through the early 2000s, with a focus on "all the songs and artists that helped make Z93 famous". The first song under the relaunched brand was "Gonna Make You Sweat (Everybody Dance Now)" by C&C Music Factory.

== See also ==
- WCTM
- WING
- WROU-FM
- WDHT
- List of radio stations in Ohio
