= WOXY.com =

Modern rock internet radio station

WOXY.com logo

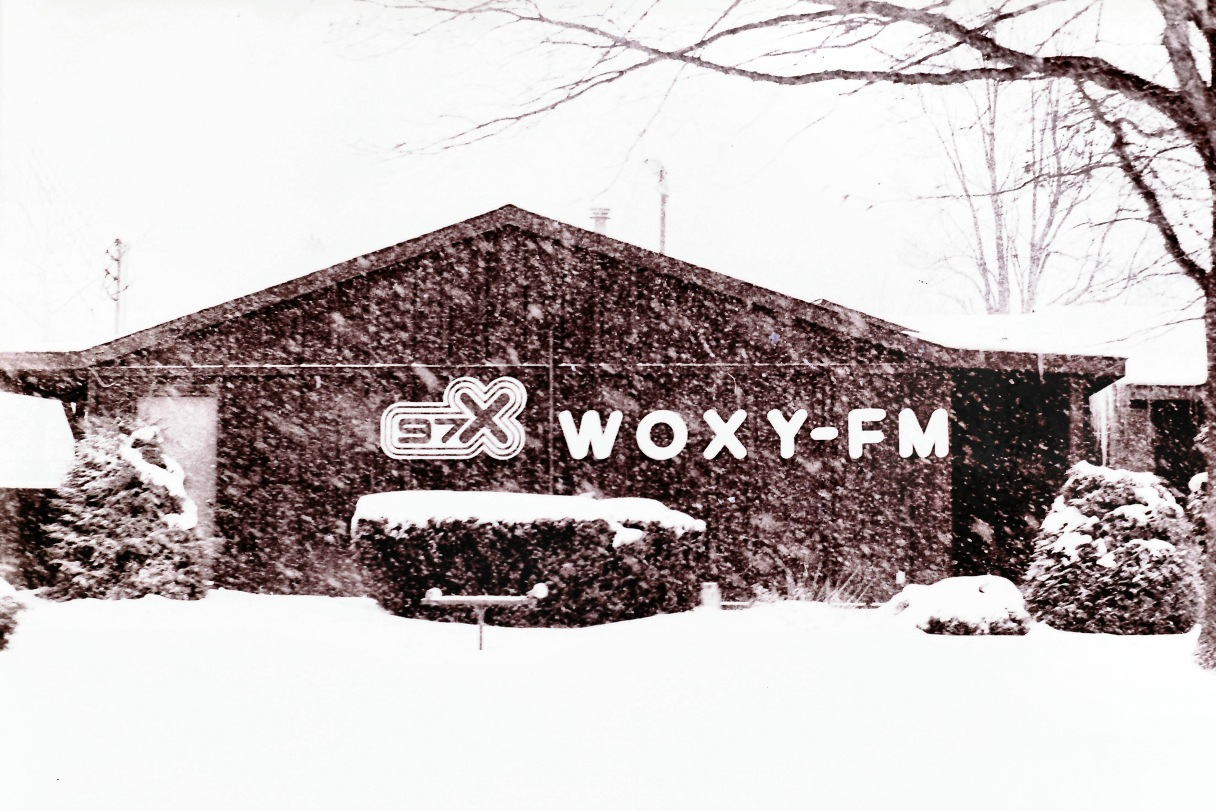
97X studio around Jan. 1985

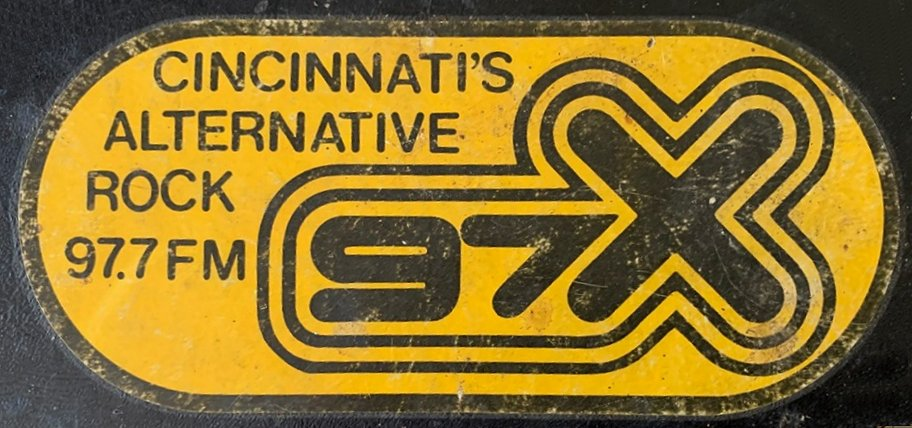
97X Decal 1985

WOXY.com was a modern rock internet radio station based in Oxford, Ohio, and later Austin, Texas. WOXY.com relied mainly on its own website to reach its listeners. WOXY.com programming at one time was also available at lala.com and WVXU HD Radio.

Originally transmitted solely from WOXY 97.7 FM in Oxford, Ohio, the station went by the 97X moniker as well as the tag line "the future of rock and roll." In 2004, WOXY became one of the first commercial radio stations in the United States to completely transition from terrestrial FM radio to broadcasting solely as an Internet radio station at WOXY.com. The station moved its studios from Cincinnati, Ohio, to Austin in 2009. In 2010, due to financial challenges, the station ended its online feed. On November 23, 2011, the station's remaining WOXY.com website and discussion forums were taken offline by owner Future Sounds.

== 97X (1983–2004) ==
=== The birth of 97X ===
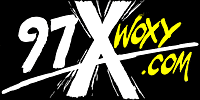
Classic 97X logo

In 1981 the station was purchased by Doug and Linda Balogh for $375,000. Soon after the station adopted the moniker "97X." Based on feedback from focus groups of college students, the station switched to a modern rock format in September 1983, reportedly the sixth modern rock station in the country. The station benefited from a large youthful audience at adjacent Miami University as well as listeners in urban and suburban areas of Cincinnati and Dayton, but the majority of its broadcast area was rural.

WOXY's tagline, "97X, Bam! The future of rock and roll," was quoted by Dustin Hoffman's character Raymond Babbitt in the 1988 film Rain Man.

In 1988, Cincinnati magazine named 97X the best "cutting edge" radio station in the Cincinnati area. WOXY placed in the Rolling Stone reader's poll "best radio station" category four times between 1990 and 1995. Rolling Stone also recognized WOXY as one of ten "stations that don't suck" in 1998 and one of four "last great independent" radio stations in 2003.

=== Webcast (1998–2010) ===
In 1998, WOXY began to experiment with webcasts, and listeners tuned in from around the world; the Internet listenership continued to grow. The station continued to broadcast online while building a website with message boards and information to create a community of modern rock. The station was also one of a number of stations offered in the Internet radio section of iTunes.

=== End of FM broadcast ===
In January 2004, the Baloghs sold the license to 97.7 FM to Dallas, Texas-based First Broadcasting Investment Partners for $5.6 million but retained the station's music library and 97X brand with the intention of continuing broadcasting as internet-only WOXY.com. 97X ended its terrestrial broadcasting on 97.7 FM on May 13, 2004.

The future of "The Future of Rock and Roll" was to be on the Internet, broadcasting exclusively from the WOXY.com website. The staff committed to staying with the WOXY.com venture worked feverishly over the following five months to secure funding and advertisers for what was at the time an unheard of business venture; an Internet-only commercial radio station. However, appropriate funding for the transition did not initially appear, so the station was forced to shut down operations on Thursday, May 13, 2004 and terminate its broadcast, not only via its 97.7 FM transmission, but also via WOXY.com.

== WOXY.com (2004–2010) ==
=== Background ===
One day after 97X left the FM airwaves, on Friday, May 14, 2004, representatives of anonymous angel investors contacted the station staff, intent on funding the WOXY.com venture. After two months of legalities, on July 12, 2004, "The Future of Rock and Roll" resumed its WOXY.com broadcast. As a subtle nod to its 1983 FM debut ("Sunday Bloody Sunday" by the Irish band U2), the first song played on the resumed WOXY.com broadcast was "Orpheus" by the Irish alternative rock band Ash.

Because of the nature of the 97.7 FM sale to First Broadcasting out of Texas, "The Future of Rock & Roll" was able to continue broadcasting from the Oxford, Ohio building until a more touring musician friendly location could be found. In September 2004, WOXY.com operations were relocated to Cincinnati's Longworth Hall, a building at the intersection of three interstate highways and close to multiple concert venues.

=== Publicity ===
To herald its return to broadcasting, "The Future of Rock & Roll" relied on a viral campaign to be carried out by its loyal listeners. WOXY provided via its website, avatars, banners, buttons, PDF files, etc., all with the intention of getting the word out; "The Future of Rock & Roll" is back! The station also purchased some well placed ads in music oriented magazines.

=== Programming ===
The internet definitely allowed for more programming avenues and outlets than standard FM radio ever did. "The Future of Rock and Roll" continued to find innovative ways to program the station.

- BAM! Modern Rock: Even with a new engine driving the music, "The Future of Rock and Roll" remained true to its roots; real DJs programming the music they choose from the Modern Rock library they have been building upon since the beginning.
- WOXY Lounge Acts
- WOXY Vintage: In 2005, "The Future of Rock & Roll" also looked fondly towards their past and launched a secondary stream of audio, WOXY Vintage. This additional channel featured a 30-year mix of music that spotlighted the history of modern rock and alternative music.
- Unsigned@WOXY.com
- X-trabeats: Revisiting the popularity of "97X-trabeats", "The Future of Rock and Roll" revived the dance/electronica showcase. The only minor changes being the dropping of the '97' and making the program available on demand in addition to the scheduled airings.
- Local Lixx
- Artrocker Radio
- Friends Of The Futurist: An interview and music showcase, in which a member of the music community (music blogger, podcast host, etc.) would spend time speaking with host Joe Long discussing the artist, venues and anything else on the topic of music as it represents the guest's locale. "Friends Of The Futurist" aired bi-weekly on Tuesday evenings. Early "Friends Of The Futurist" episodes were broadcast under the original name, "The Blogger Hour".
- The Waiting Room: An eclectic mix of folk and acoustic tunes from around the globe, hosted by "one half of Drunk Country & The Woman of The House", still presently alive on AndHow.FM from Mangaroa, New Zealand.

==== Commercial ====
Most closely resembling the FM 'Future of Rock and Roll', WOXY.com, or WOXY (wox-IE) as it came to be known, sold banner ads on the pages of WOXY.com along with advertised sponsorship of some its mainstay programming to cover costs. Not only did this practice not yield a profit, it did not even cover operational costs. Accepting that their investor money was eroding faster than they hoped, "The Future of Rock & Roll" tried a new approach.

==== Subscription-based ====
On February 6, 2006, WOXY.com announced it would be moving to a subscriber-based model. In an effort to counteract a lack of advertising revenue, subscribers were to pay $9.95 per month for 128 kbit/s streams (both the main channel and the vintage channel) as well other perks including special content and contests.

Despite popularity with listeners, the station's capital was running out, and the costs to operate far exceeded any income from subscriptions, fund raising, or from Internet advertising. On August 31, 2006, WOXY.com released a statement announcing that they would cease broadcasting. The last broadcast was September 15, 2006, and transmission ended around 5:38 p.m. EDT.

Bryan Jay Miller, the station's general manager, stated in a written announcement on the station's website that "barring something exceptional happening in the next two weeks, we will silence our broadcasts." The last few songs the station played underscored what they believed to be the finality of the suspension of broadcasting, including the songs "Mourning Air" by Portishead, "Acquiesce" by Oasis, "Fight the Power", by Public Enemy, and the final track, MC5's song "Kick Out the Jams".

==== Lala.com ====
On September 19, 2006, Silicon Valley entrepreneur Bill Nguyen expressed interest in purchasing the station and resuming online broadcasting. A fan of modern rock, Nguyen was contacted by a station listener through his music trading website Lala. In an unusual approach, Nguyen not only met with staff members and the station's current anonymous owners/investors, but also used the station's message boards to get feedback from listeners before formally making an offer.

Nguyen's proposal was to invest between $5 million and $10 million into WOXY.com, and allow the station to remain in Cincinnati. The DJs would retain editorial control. He would also link lala.com to WOXY.com, to allow WOXY.com listeners to purchase music that they've heard on the station directly from his existing site. Among his many initial proposals, he also proposed coordinating live performances in San Francisco and other locations that would subsequently be broadcast on WOXY.com. A deal was reached, and the station resumed online broadcasting as of 10:10 am EST on October 10, 2006.

Lala.com was quietly purchased by Apple in December 2009 and was shuttered by Apple on May 31, 2010.

==== Future Sounds Inc. ====
On February 5, 2009, the station announced that it had been sold by Lala.com and would join Future Sounds, Inc. a company specializing in the discovery and exposure of new and unsigned bands and artists. The Futuresounds.com website is currently up for sale with no other active web presence known.

=== WVXU-HD2 simulcast ===
In August 2007, a deal was finalized between WOXY.com and Cincinnati public radio station WVXU where in, WVXU would partner with "The Future of Rock & Roll" and broadcast WOXY.com main channel programming on their second HD Radio channel. The availability of WOXY.com on HD Radio marked The Future of Rock and Roll's return to the local terrestrial airwaves since the 97.7 FM transmission was terminated.

=== Austin, TX relocation ===
On July 16, 2009, the WOXY staff formally announced that the station's broadcast facilities would be relocated to Austin, Texas. Reasons cited include increased access to artists for live Lounge Act sessions and proximity to the thriving Austin music scene, including the SXSW festival. The station move FAQ has indicated that the formatting and live DJ lineup will remain the same. The station will continue broadcasting on the air in Cincinnati via WVXU 91.7 FM on the HD-2 sideband channel.

=== Shutdown ===
At approximately 9:13 CDT on March 23, 2010 WOXY.com stopped streaming audio, and posted the following on their main page:

WOXY Listeners, Fans and Friends...

Due to current economic realities and the lack of ongoing funding for WOXY's operations, we've been forced to suspend our live broadcasts as of March 23. We're continuing to explore options to keep The Future of Rock and Roll alive. For business inquiries, please contact Bryan Jay or John at Future Sounds.

Thanks for your years of dedicated support.

- Mike, Shiv, Joe, Paige, Brian and Bryan Jay

The song playing when they halted streaming was "Answer to Yourself" by The Soft Pack.

=== DJs ===
The regular DJs were Mike Taylor (Program Director) now a DJ on Amazing Radio, Matt Shiv (Music Director) and Joe Long (editor of WOXY's The Futurist blog).

Also included in this list were Robin Plan, Steve Baker, Dan Reed, Michelle Topham, Ken Glidewell, and John Jesser who were all present in the station's prime during the mid-80s.

Since 2019 there has been a podcast from two former station employees titled "97X Rumblings From the Big Bush" (big bush is a reference of the large bush that grew by the station parking lot) featuring interviews with Doug and Linda Balogh, many of the station personalities, record company executives. It is available at most major podcast centers or on the website www.97Xbam.com.

=== 40th Anniversary Broadcast ===
On May 27, 2023, Internet radio station Inhailer Radio hosted an all new 3 day broadcast of the Modern Rock 500, a WOXY Memorial Day weekend tradition, featuring many of the original staff sharing memories of the station.

== List of awards ==
The Internet-only incarnation of the station has won multiple times at the PLUG Independent Music Awards:

- 2005 Internet radio station of the year
- 2007 Internet radio station of the year
- 2007 Podcast of the Year: WOXY.com Lounge Acts

== See also ==
- List of Internet radio stations
- WKRP-FM, the current terrestrial radio station at 97.7 FM in the Cincinnati area
- WOXY 94.5 FM
