= WBZI =

- Xenia, Ohio; United States
- Broadcast area: Dayton metropolitan area
- Frequency: 1500 kHz
- Branding: Real Roots Radio

Programming
- Language: English
- Format: Classic country
- Affiliations: Fox News Radio; Ohio News Network; United Stations Radio Networks; Ohio Ag Net; Brownfield Network

Ownership
- Owner: Town And Country Broadcasting, Inc.
- Sister stations: WEDI; WKFI

History
- First air date: 1963
- Former call signs: WGIC (1963–84); WBZI (1984–85); WLGY (1985–87)
- Call sign meaning: "BZI" can be pronounced as "busy"

Technical information
- Licensing authority: FCC
- Facility ID: 69992
- Class: D
- Power: 500 watts day
- Transmitter coordinates: 39°42′48″N 83°54′48″W
- Translator: see below
- Repeater: see below

Links
- Public license information: Public file; LMS
- Webcast: Listen live; Listen live (via TuneIn)
- Website: realrootsradio.com

WBZI (1500 AM "Real Roots Radio") is a daytime-only radio station in Xenia, Ohio, United States, operating with 500 watts. Its current owner Town and Country Broadcasting operates it with a country oldies format serving Greene, Clark, eastern Montgomery and surrounding counties. Its downtown studios are located on West Second Street and transmitter on East Kinsey Road (the former studio location.) World news from Fox News Radio is aired at the top of the hour in addition to farm and agriculture news from the ABN throughout the day.

== History ==
Began operation in November 1963 by founder Xenia Broadcasting Inc. as WGIC (for "Greene Information Center"). It is Xenia and Greene County's first and oldest full service AM radio station. Crosstown competitor WHBM (now WZDA licensed to Beavercreek) was the first Xenia FM station being founded one year earlier. Several format changes took place on the station during the 1970s, most noted as contemporary hit-formatted "G-15" using an automation package called "Stereo Rock" produced by Dallas-based TM Productions being used successfully on FM stations at the time (notably the former WPTH in Fort Wayne, WFBQ in Indianapolis and WCIT in Lima). The format was switched over to 95.3 FM in 1978 as "I-95" (where the WBZI calls originated). As a result, WGIC swapped contemporary hits for southern gospel competing with crosstown rival WELX (now WGNZ).

The former WGIC and its news department played a huge role in relaying information and desperately needed help between the listening public and the local residents in the aftermath of an F5 tornado which ravaged the city of Xenia and the neighboring communities of Beavercreek and Wilberforce on April 3, 1974. As such, WGIC operated on an emergency basis past its daytime hours-only license during this time.

WBZI-FM switched to Country music in 1980 competing with WONE in Dayton and the former WJAI in Eaton (now WGTZ). Several other format and callsign changes took place quite frequently for the FM station throughout the 1980s and 1990s. It is currently classic hits WZLR.

WBZI moved to AM 1500 in 1984 for about a year, then reassigned later in 1988 and with it the country format (after a two-year stint as WLGY from 1985 to 1987.) It is currently managed by Joe Mullins, son of fiddler and Bluegrass personality Paul "Moon" Mullins (not to be confused with the radio Hall of Famer also known as "Moon" Mullins, who died in 2017, from WBKR) who retired from radio broadcasting in 2005 due to the impact of Parkinson's disease. Moon died in 2008. Like his father, Joe is also a bluegrass musician as well as a broadcaster. In addition to managing the station, Joe is also the current afternoon personality with two programs, Hymns from the Hills and The Banjo Show.

Their web-site features a listen live feature.

On March 23, 2018, WBZI rebranded as "Real Roots Radio".

== Real Roots Radio ==
Real Roots Radio is also heard on:

AM repeaters

WKFI 1090 in Wilmington, Ohio serving southwestern Ohio, metropolitan Cincinnati and portions of Northern Kentucky.

WEDI 1130 in Eaton, Ohio serving Preble, western Montgomery and surrounding counties in Western Ohio and Eastern Indiana.

FM translator

W262BG 100.3 in Xenia serving Xenia and nearby communities.

== See also ==
- WEDI (AM)
- Classic country
- Bluegrass music
- Christian country music
- Southern Gospel
- List of radio stations in Ohio
