= WKCD =

K-Love radio station in Cedarville–Dayton, Ohio

- Cedarville, Ohio; United States
- Broadcast area: Dayton
- Frequency: 90.3 MHz (HD Radio)
- Branding: K-Love

Programming
- Format: Contemporary Christian Music
- Subchannels: HD2: Air1
- Affiliations: K-Love

Ownership
- Owner: EMF Broadcasting

History
- First air date: December 1, 1962 (as WCDR)
- Former call signs: WCDR-FM (1962–2011)
- Call sign meaning: W K-loveCeDarville

Technical information
- Licensing authority: FCC
- Facility ID: 65515
- Class: B
- ERP: 8,700 watts
- HAAT: 291 meters
- Transmitter coordinates: 39°45′46″N 83°52′59″W
- Translators: 94.1 W231BY (Bellefontaine); 103.7 W279BB (Urbana); 103.7 W279BR (Greenville)

Links
- Public license information: Public file; LMS
- Webcast: Listen Live
- Website: K-Love website

WKCD (90.3 FM "Positive, Encouraging K-LOVE") is a radio station broadcasting a Religious format. Licensed to Cedarville, Ohio, United States, it serves the Dayton area. The station is owned by EMF Broadcasting.

In 2011, the Cedarville University Board of Trustees voted to divest ownership of the radio ministry to EMF Broadcasting, operators of two Christian radio formats: K-LOVE and Air1.
