= WOXY =

Simulcasts WNKR Williamstown, Kentucky
- Englewood, Ohio; United States
- Broadcast area: Dayton metropolitan area
- Frequency: 94.5 MHz
- Branding: WKRP The Oasis

Programming
- Format: Oldies

Ownership
- Owner: Radioactive, LLC
- Sister stations: WKRP-FM

History
- First air date: December 16, 1993 (as WZJX)
- Former call signs: WZJX (1993–1994); WDOL (1994–1996); WBTT (1996–2000); WDKF (2000–2011); WLQT (2011–2013); WYDB (2013–2026)

Technical information
- Licensing authority: FCC
- Facility ID: 55501
- Class: A
- ERP: 3,600 watts
- HAAT: 130 meters (430 ft)
- Transmitter coordinates: 39°49′3″N 84°14′53″W

Links
- Public license information: Public file; LMS
- Webcast: Listen live
- Website: www.wherethemusicwent.com

WOXY (94.5 FM) is a commercial radio station broadcasting an oldies radio format. Licensed to Englewood, Ohio, the station serves the Dayton metropolitan area. It is owned and operated by Radioactive, LLC, which is owned by former Jacor Communications and iHeartMedia executive Randy Michaels.

WOXY has an effective radiated power (ERP) of 3,600 watts, using a directional antenna. The transmitter is on Trinity Church Road near Shiloh Springs Road in Dayton.

== History ==
=== Classical (1962–1970) ===
The original station at 94.5 MHz was given the call sign WKET in 1962. It played classical music from a basement studio at the former Hills and Dales Shopping Center. The station failed to attract a sizable listening audience (AM was the dominant band at that time).

It was sold to the University of Dayton in 1964, which changed the call letters to WVUD (for the "Voice of the University of Dayton"). The WKET call letters are now used at 98.3 FM in Kettering.

=== Album rock (1970–1985) ===
In the 1970s, WVUD became Dayton's first album oriented rock station, providing an alternative to Top 40-formatted WING. The station was approved for a 50,000-watt transmitter and a 500-foot tower on Stuart Hill, the highest point on the university's campus. That allowed the station's signal to reach well into eastern Indiana and northern Kentucky, gaining a wide listening audience in the tri-state area. While the station's management, programmers and sales staff were all seasoned radio professionals, the air staff consisted solely of University of Dayton students.

From the late 1960s through the mid-1970s, WVUD's General Manager was University of Dayton Communication Arts Department Chairman George Biersack. Biersack hired former WVUD staffer and UD grad Chris Cage (Caggiano) from WING as the station's Program Director and Biersack's marching orders for Cage were to "grab the 18- to 34-year-olds" but to "avoid that WING sound". Cage's Music Director was Kevin Carroll, who went on to work for several major record labels. Cage was succeeded by Geoff Vargo, and Carroll was replaced by Dan Covey, who later landed at WING.

In its heyday (the mid-to-late 1970s), WVUD-FM competed with WTUE-FM for rock listeners in the Dayton market. Utilizing a strategy of first-to-market "breaking" of new songs, a vast collection of record albums, and a lengthy song-rotation schedule (to keep the sound "fresh"), the station competed on its diversity of music and the disc jockeys' knowledge of artists and bands. The station enjoyed stature and cache sufficient that touring major rock acts, such as Jackson Browne, Shawn Phillips, and Billy Joel, were interviewed live in-studio. Students staffed on-air slots and handled news and sports programming content as well. Over the years, WVUD air personalities such as Steve Wendell, Dan Covey, Art Farkas, Alan McConnell, Dan Pugh (later known as Dan Patrick), Bill Andres, Bill Pugh, "Dolby" Joe Reiling, Steve Downes, Lou Chelekis, Rich Wieser (The Weezer), Patty Spittler, Michael Luczak, Mary Kuzan, Steve Kerrigan, Jim Tobin (Yost), Keith Wright, Sandy Huff, Dave McGuire (Vadnais), Jim Biggins, Joe Rittman, Dan Ross, Bob Eidem and Mark Zona competed successfully with much more experienced radio pros in the Dayton market. After graduation, many WVUD "alumni" went on to attain significant professional career success in radio nationwide.

On April 1, 1977, the station spoofed listeners, claiming it had, overnight, changed formats to big-band 1940s music. Complaints to station management from loyal, if disgruntled, listeners were counted into the hundreds. So convincing was the transformation, that many did not realize it was an "April Fool's" joke. To listeners' delight, normal operations resumed the next day.

One of WVUD listeners' favorite programs was Wax Museum, where a complete rock album was played from beginning to end without interruption. DJs hosting "Wax" encouraged listeners to record the album off-air and even provided calibration tones ("set your recording levels to minus three db") and signals to begin and pause recording. (The signal was a guitar strum taken from the Yes song "Roundabout".) Popular station jingles included "It's a real nice way to spend a day in Dayton, Ohio" (from Randy Newman) and "Turn on your radio, listen to my song" (from Harry Nilssen).

In addition, the station aired a popular talk program for young married couples called Christian Marriage, moderated by Father Norbert Burns, a popular long-time University of Dayton instructor and professor, now retired. Also, at least through 1982, the station provided Saturday and Sunday morning air time to ethnic music: "Music of Hungary" (with Al Kertez) and "Music of India" (with Parmada Singh Sihoda) were aired for years.

In 1976, WTUE (then owned by Group One Broadcasting) abandoned its Top 40 format in favor of an album-oriented format in order to compete directly with WVUD. Eventually, as the 1980s dawned, WTUE started to win the ratings war (in large part by hiring former WVUD air talent as they graduated and were no longer eligible to work for the university-owned station). In 1982, in an effort to boost lost ratings, WVUD switched to a "Contemporary Hit" format and the "AOR era" at the station was over. While loyal listeners and station personnel mourned the loss, the station continued to garner respectable (though not overwhelming) ratings into the latter part of the 1980s. The university sold WVUD-FM in 1992, and the WVUD call letters were subsequently adopted by another college radio station in Delaware (The University of Delaware).

=== Adult contemporary (1985–2013) ===
WVUD was eventually sold by the University of Dayton in 1992, becoming WLQT ("Lite 100") after a brief stint as a contemporary hit station before competitor WGTZ-FM(Z-93) emerged in 1984. It changed its name to "Lite 99.9" in 1993 under the direction of programmer Scott Barrett. WLQT subsequently became part of American Radio Systems in 1996, and was subsequently bought by Jacor in 1997 (later merging with Clear Channel). Aside from its light rock and HD oldies frequency, WLQT has aired Christmas music every year during the holidays since 1993 until its call sign change in 2013. Jacor Regional Programmer Vance Dillard was one of the first to believe in 24/7 Christmas music. WLQT was one of the first stations in the country to take this programming risk, and proved that the format is a ratings-winner.

WLQT was awarded the National Association of Broadcasters (NAB) Crystal Award for Excellence in Public Service in 2002. Over 13,000 stations are eligible for the distinction, and only 10 station per year are awarded at the NAB Radio Show conference in Las Vegas, Nevada.

Dayton's Kim Faris became the morning show host of Lite 99.9 in June 2007. The station was also home to the Delilah After Dark show (save for a brief period in the middle of 2011, where the station moved to 94.5).

On October 5, 2009, WLQT rebranded as "99.9 Lite FM."

On May 24, 2011, Clear Channel announced that Top 40/CHR sister station WDKF would swap signals with WLQT, thus giving the former more signal coverage in the Dayton area. With the change, the station shifted its longtime adult contemporary format to that of a more gold-based approach, playing soft hits from artists such as Celine Dion, The Carpenters, Elton John, and Phil Collins. One year later, WLQT backed away from the Soft AC artists and shifted to a more mainstream adult contemporary format with the re-addition of current tracks to the station's playlist.

=== Country (2013–2021) ===
WYDB's logo under previous country format

At Noon on July 3, 2013, after playing "We Said Hello Goodbye" by Phil Collins, WLQT suddenly terminated its longtime adult contemporary format and flipped to Country music as "Hot Country B94.5". "B" launched with "The Only Way I Know" by Jason Aldean. Kim Farris, the morning host, was retained and transferred to afternoons. The call sign changed to WYDB on August 23, 2013.

WYDB relaunched a WLQT-branded HD2 digital subchannel in September 2015, initially stunting with Christmas music.

=== Talk (2021–2025) ===
WYDB's logo using "The Answer" branding

On May 17, 2021, iHeartMedia announced that WYDB and sister station WRZX would be donated to Delmarva Educational Association from the Aloha Station Trust. Due to acquisitions, iHeart had more radio stations in the Dayton radio market than the FCC would allow, requiring two to be placed in the trust. The deal closed on August 2, 2021.

At midnight that day, the station flipped to "94.5 Conservative Talk". The station began airing talk shows from the Salem Radio Network, including Hugh Hewitt, Dennis Prager, Sebastian Gorka, Mike Gallagher, Charlie Kirk, Eric Metaxas, Brandon Tatum and Bruce Hooley. It also carried Mark Levin, Lars Larson and This Morning, America's First News with Gordon Deal.

Weekends featured shows on money, health, guns, real estate and the outdoors, as well as repeats of some weekday shows. Most hours began with an update from Fox News Radio.

=== Oldies (2025-present) ===
On August 1, 2025, WYDB changed their format from conservative talk to oldies by being added to the simulcast of WNKR's oldies format programming, branded as "The Oasis".

On May 4, 2026, the "Oasis" brand was relaunched as "WKRP The Oasis" after operator Radioactive LLC, led by longtime media executive Randy Michaels, won the rights to use the WKRP call letters, and, as a tribute to sitcom WKRP in Cincinnati, chose to do so on the "Oasis" simulcast stations (as simulcast partner WOXY 97.7 FM broadcast into the Cincinnati market). The company filed with the FCC for 94.5 to take on the WOXY call letters as part of the move, which became effective at the same time as 97.7 took the WKRP call letters on May 8.
