= WKRP-FM =

Coordinates: 39.3492°N 84.2022°W

Simulcasting WNKR Williamstown, Kentucky
- Mason, Ohio; United States
- Broadcast area: Cincinnati, Ohio; Dayton, Ohio
- Frequency: 97.7 MHz
- Branding: WKRP The Oasis

Programming
- Format: Oldies
- Affiliations: Westwood One

Ownership
- Owner: Randy Michaels; (Radioactive, LLC)
- Operator: Grant County Broadcasters, Inc

History
- First air date: December 24, 1959
- Former call signs: WOXR (1959–1978); WOXY (1978–2026)
- Call sign meaning: WKRP in Cincinnati, television series aired from 1978 to 1982

Technical information
- Facility ID: 3653
- Class: A
- ERP: 2,700 watts
- HAAT: 151.5 meters (497 ft)

Links
- Webcast: Listen live
- Website: www.wherethemusicwent.com

WKRP-FM (97.7 MHz) is an FM radio station licensed to Mason, Ohio, as part of the Cincinnati and Dayton, Ohio, markets. Nicknamed WKRP The Oasis, the station broadcasts an oldies music format.

Originally located in Oxford, Ohio, the station began broadcasting in 1959 as WOXR before changing its call sign to WOXY in 1978. The station became widely known, as 97X, for its successful alternative rock format from 1983 to 2004.

== History ==
=== WOXR (1959–1983) ===
Based in Oxford, Ohio, WOXR broadcast a top 40 format at 97.7 FM, largely targeted at Miami University students. WOXR also played listener requests. During the 1970s, WOXR featured a blend of top 40 and progressive rock during the day, an hour-long oldies show at 5:00 PM, with the evening music again a top-40/album rock mix that became more and more album-oriented as the night got later.

WOXR was known for playing uncensored versions of songs such as Steppenwolf's recording of "The Pusher" and Country Joe and the Fish's recording of the "I-Feel-Like-I'm-Fixin'-to-Die Rag". Late at night the station played uncut versions of long songs such as Neil Young's "Cowgirl in the Sand" and "Down by the River" and Traffic's "John Barleycorn Must Die".

The station was among few in the U.S. to play the cult classic "Je t'aime... moi non plus" ("I love you... me neither"), performed by Serge Gainsbourg and his partner Jane Birkin, which most stations refused to play (or were forbidden to play) because of its sexual explicitness in the form of the lyrics being sung to a background sound of a female orgasm (which some say was the sound of the couple actually having sex).

WOXR showed an irreverent on-air personality, identifying itself as coming "from the city by the water tower" (a take-off on Chicago's WLS identifying itself as being "from the city by the shore"). WOXR played on the culture shock many Miami students from large cities experienced at the start of the school year when they found themselves confined to a town much smaller than their hometowns by identifying itself as being "Down on the Farm," sung to a twangy beat. The song went as follows:

You are listenin' to the big 97,
Where it does sound like heaven,
Tap your foot 'cause you love it so,
Hearin' that good old rock and roll.
This here station's got a lotta power,
But that's because of the water tower,
If you dig it we do know why,
And with that verse we'll say "bye bye."

Every April Fool's Day, WOXR played the same song repeatedly for an entire hour (then playing a different song during the next hour, etc.). WOXR featured contests with prizes consisting of album rejects (called "The Worst Contest"). One of their newscasters always referred to then-Secretary of State Henry Kissinger as "Hank" Kissinger. Another newscaster who was a Boston native and Red Sox fan would only give the score of the Red Sox game, while failing to mention the scores of any other games.

Bob Nave, keyboardist for the Lemon Pipers in the late 1960s (whose big hit was the song "Green Tambourine"), was a late-night DJ for WOXR in the early 1970s. Other early to mid-1970s on-air personalities for the station included Rick Sellers, Ray Smith and Ed Pharr. Nave's program featured a brief comedy program known as "The Purple Nurd," produced by four high school students from Fairfield, Ohio, who billed themselves as HPW Squared Productions. The Purple Nurd program later grew into "The Electromagnetic Spectrum," which featured spoofs of local commercials and television shows.

The station featured on-air classified ads identified as the "Dog-Gone Bulletin Board". This was a pun based on classified ads placed by dog owners to let everyone know that their dog was missing—or "dog-gone".

WOXR was among the few FM stations at the time to carry live broadcasts of sports events. During the 1970s, WOXR broadcast Miami University football and basketball games as well as Cleveland Browns games, tapping into the southern Ohio fan base that the NFL team cultivated before the Cincinnati Bengals were established.

=== 97X (1983–2004) ===
97X logo

In 1981, the station was purchased by Doug and Linda Balogh for $375,000. Soon after, the station adopted the moniker "97X" and the studio was relocated from its uptown location on High St. to College Corner Pike. Based on feedback from focus groups of college students, the station switched to a modern rock format in September 1983, reportedly the sixth modern rock station in the country. The station benefited from a large youthful audience at adjacent Miami University as well as listeners in urban and suburban areas of Cincinnati and Dayton, but the majority of its broadcast area was rural.

The first song played when WOXY-FM made their transition to a modern rock format was "Sunday Bloody Sunday" by U2. "Sunday Bloody Sunday" was also the last song played by the station to end their terrestrial 97.7 FM transmission in May 2004.

WOXY's tagline, "97X, Bam! The future of rock and roll," was quoted by Dustin Hoffman's character Raymond Babbitt in the 1988 film Rain Man. This is an example of echolalia. One of the current anchors on Fox News Channel, Bill Hemmer, interned as a disc jockey at WOXY in the mid-1980s.

In 1988, Cincinnati magazine named 97X the best "cutting edge" radio station in the Cincinnati area. WOXY placed in the Rolling Stone reader's poll "best radio station" category four times between 1990 and 1995. Rolling Stone also recognized WOXY as one of ten "stations that don't suck" in 1998 and one of four "last great independent" radio stations in 2003.

The station also sponsored 97Xposure, a Tri-State area-based "Battle of the Bands" for local talent. It served as the "jumping-off point" for local bands such as the Ass Ponys to make their way to the national stage."WOXY 97.7 Oxford, OH 27 April 1999".

In January 2004, the Baloghs sold the license to 97.7 FM to Dallas, Texas-based First Broadcasting Investment Partners for $5.6 million but retained the station's music library and 97X brand with the intention of continuing broadcasting as internet-only WOXY.com. 97X ended its terrestrial broadcasting on 97.7 FM on May 13, 2004.

97X was broadcast on WOXY.com from July 2004 until it was shut down in March 2010 due to financial difficulties.

=== Max FM (2004–2010) ===
First Broadcasting rebranded WOXY as X97-7, broadcasting a satellite-fed modern rock format. In August 2005, the station was relaunched as "Max FM", an adult hits format without disc jockeys, similar in style to the syndicated Jack FM brand.

==== New city of license ====
On July 1, 2006, WOXY was granted a construction permit (CP) by the Federal Communications Commission (FCC) to improve its signal by moving its city of license to Mason, Ohio, from Oxford, and its antenna to a tower north of Mason. On April 17, 2009, a modification to the CP was granted, allowing WOXY to move its antenna to a tower east of Mason. This location provides a better signal over the northeast portion of the Cincinnati market including more of Hamilton County and the city of Cincinnati than was originally provided in the original CP. On June 5, 2009, WOXY filed a "License to Cover" with the FCC indicating the tower location and city of license had been changed. As of June 8, 2009, the station's new legal ID was worded as, "WOXY Mason, Oxford, Cincinnati".

=== La Mega 97.7 (2010–2024) ===
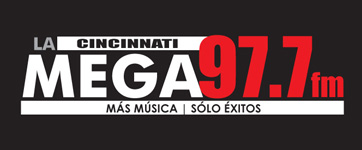
Logo as "La Mega 97.7"

In October 2010, First Broadcasting entered into a local marketing agreement for the WOXY-FM frequency with TSJ News Incorporated, a Spanish-language media company in Cincinnati, Ohio. TSJ assumed operation of WOXY and the station switched to a Spanish variety format, branded as "La Mega 97.7", on November 15, 2011.

TSJ News' licensee TSJ Radio, LLC acquired WOXY from First Broadcasting effective March 20, 2015, at a purchase price of $900,000.

La Mega broadcasts originate from a studio at TSJ's headquarters in Blue Ash, Ohio. Most daytime dayparts have Spanish-speaking disc jockeys, including morning and afternoon drive times. In addition to Spanish variety music, La Mega broadcasts community information and announcements targeted toward the Greater Cincinnati Latino community.

On March 4, 2019, Lazo Media LLC acquired WOXY from TSJ Radio, LLC.

On August 21, 2024, the pending sale of WOXY to longtime broadcaster Randy Michaels was announced.

=== The Oasis (2024–present) ===
On October 1, 2024, WOXY changed their format from Spanish variety to a simulcast of adult hits-formatted WNKR 106.7 FM Williamstown, Kentucky, branded as "97.7/106.7 The Oasis".

In April 2026, "Oasis" operator Radioactive LLC, led by Randy Michaels, won the rights to use the WKRP call letters in an auction held by Oak City Media, who operates the WKRP intellectual property for use on their station WKRP-LP and had chosen to allow them for use by such method; the company announced their intentions to place the call letters on 97.7 FM, acknowledging their legendary association with the market due to the sitcom WKRP in Cincinnati, and filed with the FCC to officially do so on May 8 of that year; on May 4 at 6 a.m., ahead of the move, after stunting for the previous evening with a loop of the aforementioned sitcom's theme song, the "Oasis" trimulcast officially relaunched with the adoption of the WKRP brand, as "WKRP, The Oasis". The station also hired Gary Sandy, an actor from the original series, to provide imaging for the relaunched format.

==== Call sign realignment ====
With the introduction of the "WKRP" branding in May 2026, the call signs of the three stations in the "Oasis" trimulcast were realigned as follows:

Freq.	Location	Call sign before May 2026	Call sign as of May 2026
94.5	Englewood, Ohio	WYDB	WOXY
97.7	Mason, Ohio	WOXY	WKRP-FM
106.7	Williamstown, Kentucky	WNKR	WNKR

== Programming ==
"The Future of Rock and Roll" 97.7 FM years featured several different programs and shows, ranging from format specific blocks of music programming, to handmade advertising spots for sponsors local to the 97.7 FM broadcasting area, to syndicated radio programs that catered to niche listeners. This incomplete list details a few of these programs.

- Modern Rock 500: One enduring staple of WOXY's broadcast was the Modern Rock 500 countdown, which took place every Memorial Day Weekend. The station played back what songs the listeners voted as the 500 best songs in its history over the course of three days. The Modern Rock 500 continued through the station's transition to Internet-only play. [Which was revived in 2023 with many WOXY alums by Cincinnati's Inhailer Radio.]
- AirChexx: A daily spotlight on two different up-and-coming bands not yet featured on the regular playlist.
- 97X-trabeats: Music showcase featuring dance and electronica music.
- Local Lixx: A weeknight show that featured a sampling of Cincinnati and Dayton, OH area musicians and bands. This show continued on and off as the station went internet-only.
- Planet X: Weekdays overnight, 1984–1989. A thematic mix of various geographical scenes (Boston, Minneapolis, Australia, New Zealand) and subgenres (Hardcore, Oi, No Wave, Surf, Swamp, Glam, Thrash, Punk Rock).
- British Exports: A three-hour Saturday morning show that featured alternative rock from the United Kingdom.
- What's Happening Weekend Report: Another highlight was the What's Happening Weekend Report, a prerecorded message that played throughout the week and highlighted local events, incoming concerts, and the occasional event on a broader scene (national and international events outside of the region).
- Free Music Break: Named for its sponsor at the time (for example, Papa John's Free Music Break) was a nightly call-in contest in which the 5th caller could win a CD and prize donated by the sponsor. A two-week moratorium was asked of the winner before competing again to give others a chance to win.
- Handmade Advertising: The station ran a number of unique advertisements. Local advertisers had the typical low-budget but yet targeted audio advertisements. One memorable ad that ran on WOXY was the "Rock 'n' Roll Grocer", which featured the chorus of The Ramones song "Rock 'n' Roll High School", with the comically flat voice of local grocery store owner Frank Eavey saying the word "grocer" dubbed over "high school". Similar ads for Jungle Jim's were common.
- Putting the 'Gee' in Ecology PSAs: WOXY also featured "Putting the 'Gee' in Ecology," a series of public service announcements that provided helpful instruction on how to conserve energy and preserve resources for the individual listener. Such suggestions as putting a lid on a pot of water to quicken boil time and sundrying laundry provided common sense alternatives to wasteful consumption that was unique from the "reduce, reuse, recycle" refrain.
- Gridlox the sound of the underground came on Sunday nights.

== See also ==
- WOXY.com
