= List of radio stations in Hawaii =

The following is a list of FCC-licensed radio stations in the U.S. state of Hawaii which can be sorted by their call signs, frequencies, cities of license, licensees, and programming formats. In addition, several stations in Honolulu also transmit their audio broadcasts on Spectrum Digital Cable for the entire state of Hawaii through local agreements.

== List of radio stations ==
Call sign	Frequency	City of License	Island	Licensee	Format
KAGB	99.1 FM	Waimea	Hawaiʻi	Pacific Radio Group, Inc.	Hawaiian AC
KAHU	91.3 FM	Pahala	Hawaiʻi	Hawaii Public Radio, Inc.	Classical
KAIM-FM	95.5 FM	Honolulu	Oʻahu	Salem Media of Hawaii, Inc.	Contemporary Christian
KAKU-LP	88.5 FM	Kahului	Maui	Maui County Community Television, Inc.	Variety/Pacifica
KANO	89.1 FM	Hilo	Hawaiʻi	Hawaii Public Radio, Inc.	Public radio
KAOI	1110 AM	Kihei	Maui	Visionary Related Entertainment, Inc.	Talk
KAOI-FM	95.1 FM	Wailuku	Maui	Visionary Related Entertainment, Inc.	Rock AC
KAOY	101.5 FM	Kealakekua	Hawaiʻi	New West Broadcasting Corp.	Adult contemporary
KAPA	100.3 FM	Hilo	Hawaiʻi	Pacific Radio Group, Inc.	Hawaiian AC
KAQA	91.9 FM	Kilauea	Hawaiʻi	Kekahu Foundation, Inc.	Variety
KBGX	105.3 FM	Keaau	Hawaiʻi	Resoante Hawaii LLC	Classic hits
KCCN-FM	100.3 FM	Honolulu	Oʻahu	SM-KCCN, LLC	Hawaiian Contemporary hits
KCIF	90.3 FM	Hilo	Hawaiʻi	CSN International	Contemporary Inspirational
KCIK	740 AM	Kihei	Maui	Relevant Radio, Inc.	Catholic
KDDB	102.7 FM	Waipahu	Oʻahu	Pacific Radio Group, Inc.	Top 40 (CHR)
KDLX	94.3 FM	Makawao	Maui	Visionary Related Entertainment, Inc.	Top 40 (CHR)
KDNN	98.5 FM	Honolulu	Oʻahu	iHM Licenses, LLC	Hawaiian Contemporary hits
KESU-LP	94.9 FM	Līhuʻe	Kauaʻi	Calvary Chapel Lihue	Religious Teaching
KEWE	1240 AM	Kahului	Maui	Visionary Related Entertainment 11, Inc.	Hawaiian
KFIP-LP	107.3 FM	Kailua-Kona	Hawaiʻi	Faith Up!	Religious Teaching
KFMN	96.9 FM	Līhuʻe	Kauaʻi	Pacific Radio Group, Inc.	Adult contemporary
KGU	760 AM	Honolulu	Oʻahu	Salem Media of Hawaii, Inc.	Sports (SM/VSIN)
KGU-FM	99.5 FM	Honolulu	Oʻahu	Salem Media of Hawaii, Inc.	Christian Talk
KHBC	92.7 FM	Hilo	Hawaiʻi	Resonate Hawaii, LLC	Adult Top 40
KHCM	880 AM	Honolulu	Oʻahu	Salem Media of Hawaii, Inc.	Korean
KHCM-FM	97.5 FM	Honolulu	Oʻahu	Salem Media of Hawaii, Inc.	Country
KHEI-FM	107.5 FM	Kihei	Maui	Visionary Related Entertainment, Inc.	Classic hits
KHJC	88.9 FM	Līhuʻe	Kauaʻi	CSN International	Religious (CSN International)
KHKA	1500 AM	Honolulu	Oʻahu	Blow Up, LLC	News/Talk/Sports (CBS)
KHKU	94.3 FM	Hanapēpē	Kauaʻi	Kauai Broadcast Partners LLC	Mainstream AC
KHLO	850 AM	Hilo	Hawaiʻi	First Assembly King's Cathedral and Chapels	Silent
KHNR	690 AM	Honolulu	Oʻahu	Salem Media of Hawaii, Inc.	Conservative talk
KHPH	88.7 FM	Kailua	Oʻahu	Hawaii Public Radio, Inc.	Public radio
KHPR	88.1 FM	Honolulu	Oʻahu	Hawaii Public Radio, Inc.	Public radio
KHVH	830 AM	Honolulu	Oʻahu	iHM Licenses, LLC	News/Talk
KHWI	92.1 FM	Hōlualoa	Hawaiʻi	Resonate Hawaii, LLC	Adult Top 40
KHXM	1370 AM	Pearl City	Oʻahu	Hochman Hawaii Two, Inc.	Chinese
KIHL-LP	103.7 FM	Hilo	Hawaiʻi	Calvary Chapel Hilo	Religious Teaching
KIKI	990 AM	Honolulu	Oʻahu	iHM Licenses, LLC	Sports (FSR)
KINE-FM	105.1 FM	Honolulu	Oʻahu	SM-KINE, LLC	Hawaiian Adult contemporary
KIOM-LP	98.9 FM	Kaunakakai	Molokaʻi	KROS Radio Association	Religious Teaching
KIPA	1060 AM	Hilo	Hawaiʻi	CSN International	Religious
KIPH	88.3 FM	Hana	Maui	Hawaii Public Radio, Inc.	Classical
KIPL	89.9 FM	Līhuʻe	Kauaʻi	Hawaii Public Radio, Inc.	Public radio
KIPM	89.7 FM	Waikapu	Maui	Hawaii Public Radio, Inc.	Classical
KIPO	89.3 FM	Honolulu	Oʻahu	Hawaii Public Radio, Inc.	Classical
KITH	98.9 FM	Kapaʻa	Kauaʻi	Hochman Hawaii Two, Inc.	World Ethnic
KJHF	103.1 FM	Kualapuʻu	Molokaʻi	Hawaii Public Radio, Inc.	Classical
KJKS	99.9 FM	Kahului	Maui	Pacific Radio Group, Inc.	Hot adult contemporary
KJMD	98.3 FM	Pukalani	Maui	Pacific Radio Group, Inc.	Contemporary Hit Radio
KJMQ	98.1 FM	Līhuʻe	Kauaʻi	Hochman Hawaii Four, Inc.	Rhythmic Contemporary
KKBG	97.9 FM	Hilo	Hawaiʻi	Pacific Radio Group, Inc.	Hot adult contemporary
KKCR	90.9 FM	Hanalei	Kauaʻi	Kekahu Foundation, Inc.	Variety
KKEA	1420 AM	Honolulu	Oʻahu	Blow Up, LLC	Sports (ESPN)
KKFJ-LP	100.9 FM	Kailua-Kona	Hawaiʻi	Green Peter Eclectic Tunez	Variety
KKHI	95.9 FM	Kaunakakai	Molokaʻi	Educational Media Foundation	Contemporary Christian (K-Love)
KKNE	940 AM	Waipahu	Oʻahu	SM-KKNE, LLC	Silent
KKOA	107.7 FM	Volcano	Hawaiʻi	Resoante Hawaii, LLC	New Country
KKOL-FM	107.9 FM	ʻAiea	Oʻahu	Salem Media of Hawaii, Inc.	Classic hits
KKUA	90.7 FM	Wailuku	Maui	Hawaii Public Radio, Inc.	Public radio
KLEO	106.1 FM	Kahaluʻu	Hawaiʻi	Pacific Radio Group, Inc.	Hot adult contemporary
KLHI-FM	92.5 FM	Kahului	Maui	Pacific Radio Group, Inc.	Hawaiian, Reggae
KLHT	1040 AM	Honolulu	Oʻahu	Calvary Chapel of Honolulu, Inc.	Religious
KLHT-FM	91.5 FM	Honolulu	Oʻahu	Calvary Chapel of Honolulu, Inc.	Religious
KLHY	91.1 FM	Kailua	Oʻahu	Educational Media Foundation	Unknown Format
KLUA	93.9 FM	Kailua Kona	Hawaiʻi	Pacific Radio Group, Inc.	Rhythmic CHR
KLUU	103.5 FM	Wahiawā	Oʻahu	Educational Media Foundation	Contemporary Christian (K-Love)
KMKV	100.7 FM	Kīhei	Maui	Educational Media Foundation	Contemporary Christian (K-Love)
KMNO	91.7 FM	Wailuku	Maui	Maui Media Initiative, Inc.	Variety
KMVI	900 AM	Kahului	Maui	Pacific Radio Group, Inc.	Sports (ESPN)
KMWB	93.1 FM	Captain Cook	Hawaiʻi	New West Broadcasting Corp.	Classic hits
KNAN	106.7 FM	Nānākuli	Oʻahu	Big D Consulting, Inc.	Hot adult contemporary
KNDI	1270 AM	Honolulu	Oʻahu	Geronimo Broadcasting, LLC	Multicultural Programming
KNKR-LP	96.1 FM	Hawi	Hawaiʻi	Kohala Radio	Variety
KNUI	550 AM	Wailuku	Maui	Pacific Radio Group, Inc.	Country
KNUQ	103.9 FM	Paʻauilo	Hawaiʻi	Visionary Related Entertainment, Inc.	World Ethnic
KNWB	97.1 FM	Hilo	Hawaiʻi	New West Broadcasting Corp.	Classic hits
KOKO-LP	96.3 FM	Hana	Maui	KOKO FM	Hawaiian
KONA-LP	100.5 FM	Kailua-Kona	Hawaiʻi	The Sanctuary of Mana Ke'a Gardens dba Radio Alchemy	Variety
KONI	104.7 FM	Lānaʻi City	Lānaʻi	Hochman Hawaii Publishing, Inc.	Classic hits
KOPO-LP	88.9 FM	Pāʻia	Maui	Paia Youth Council Inc.	Variety
KORL-FM	101.1 FM	Waiʻanae	Oʻahu	Hochman Hawaii-Three, Inc.	Classic hits
KPHI	1130 AM	Honolulu	Oʻahu	Hochman-McCann Hawaii, Inc.	Hawaiian Oldies/Classic hits
KPHW	104.3 FM	Kaneohe	Oʻahu	SM-KPHW, LLC	Top 40 (CHR)
KPMW	105.5 FM	Hāliʻimaile	Maui	Rey-Cel Broadcasting, Inc.	Contemporary Filipino Music
KPOA	93.5 FM	Lāhainā	Maui	Pacific Radio Group, Inc.	Hawaiian adult contemporary
KPOI-FM	105.9 FM	Honolulu	Oʻahu	Pacific Radio Group, Inc.	Soft adult contemporary
KPRP	650 AM	Honolulu	Oʻahu	SM-KPRP, LLC	Silent
KPUA	670 AM	Hilo	Hawaiʻi	New West Broadcasting Corp.	News/Talk/Sports
KPVS	95.9 FM	Hilo	Hawaiʻi	Pacific Radio Group, Inc.	Rhythmic CHR
KQHU-LP	98.1 FM	Honolulu	Oʻahu	New Dynasty Culture Center	Ethnic/Chinese
KQMQ-FM	93.1 FM	Honolulu	Oʻahu	Pacific Radio Group, Inc.	Hawaiian Contemporary/Reggae
KQMY	102.1 FM	Pāʻia	Maui	Hochman Hawaii Four, Inc.	Active rock
KQNG-FM	93.5 FM	Līhuʻe	Kauaʻi	Pacific Radio Group, Inc.	Top 40 (CHR)
KQNS-LP	96.9 FM	Haleʻiwa	Oʻahu	Northshore Bible Truths	Religious (Radio 74 Internationale)
KREA	1540 AM	Honolulu	Oʻahu	JMK Communications, Inc.	Silent
KRKH	97.3 FM	Wailea-Mākena	Maui	Hochman Hawaii Publishing, Inc.	Classic rock
KRKW-LP	107.3 FM	Waimea	Kauaʻi	Waimea Baptist Church	Religious Teaching
KRTR-FM	96.3 FM	Kailua	Oʻahu	SM-KRTR-FM, LLC	Adult contemporary
KRYL	106.5 FM	Haiku	Maui	Hochman Hawaii Five, Inc.	Country
KSHK	103.1 FM	Hanamāʻulu	Kauaʻi	Pacific Radio Group, Inc.	Classic rock
KSRF	95.9 FM	Poʻipū	Kauaʻi	Pacific Radio Group, Inc.	Local Hawaiian & Reggae
KSSK	590 AM	Honolulu	Oʻahu	iHM Licenses, LLC	Adult contemporary
KSSK-FM	92.3 FM	Waipahu	Oʻahu	iHM Licenses, LLC	Adult contemporary
KTBH-FM	102.7 FM	Kurtistown	Hawaiʻi	Resonate Hawaii, LLC	Hot AC/oldies
KTOH	99.9 FM	Kalaheo	Kauaʻi	Hochman Hawaii One, Inc.	Country
KTUH	90.1 FM	Honolulu	Oʻahu	The University of Hawaii	Freeform
KUAI	570 AM	ʻEleʻele	Kauaʻi	Pacific Radio Group, Inc.	Country
KUAU	1570 AM	Haiku	Maui	First Assembly King's Cathedral and Chapels	Religious Talk
KUBT	93.9 FM	Honolulu	Oʻahu	iHM Licenses, LLC	Rhythmic contemporary
KUCD	101.9 FM	Pearl City	Oʻahu	iHM Licenses, LLC	Asian CHR
KUHH-LP	101.1 FM	Hilo	Hawaiʻi	University of Hawaiʻi at Hilo	Variety
KUKE-LP	101.3 FM	Kula	Maui	Calvary Chapel Upcountry	Religious Teaching
KUMU-FM	94.7 FM	Honolulu	Oʻahu	Pacific Radio Group, Inc.	Rhythmic AC
KWXX-FM	94.7 FM	Hilo	Hawaiʻi	New West Broadcasting Corporation	Adult contemporary
KWYI	106.9 FM	Kawaihae	Hawaiʻi	Resonate Hawaii LLC	Hot AC/Oldies
KXRG-LP	95.9 FM	Honolulu	Oʻahu	Ohana Broadcasters Corporation	Dance
KZOO	1210 AM	Honolulu	Oʻahu	Polynesian Broadcasting, Inc.	J-Pop/Japanese Variety

== Defunct ==
- KCOF-LP
- KCSK-LP
- KVOK-FM
- KWAI
