= KHXM =

- Pearl City, Hawaii; United States
- Broadcast area: Honolulu County, Hawaii
- Frequency: 1370 kHz
- Branding: 103.9 The X

Programming
- Language: English
- Format: Alternative rock

Ownership
- Owner: George Hochman; (Hochman Hawaii Two, Inc.)
- Sister stations: KITH, KJMQ, KONI, KORL-FM, KPHI, KRKH, KRYL, KTOH, KQMY

History
- First air date: May 2, 1990
- Former call signs: KLNI (1982–1989); KIPO (1989–1993); KIFO (1993–2002); KMDR (2002–2003); KJPN (2003–2004); KENT (2004); KITT (2004); KFIF (2004); KUPA (2004–2020)

Technical information
- Licensing authority: FCC
- Facility ID: 26441
- Class: B
- Power: 250 watts
- Transmitter coordinates: 21°26′6.7″N 157°59′19″W
- Translators: 103.9 K280FC (Waipahu); 104.7 K284AL (Haleiwa)

Links
- Public license information: Public file; LMS
- Webcast: Listen live
- Website: HHawaiiMedia.com

KHXM (1370 AM) is a commercial radio station licensed to Pearl City, Hawaii, United States. The station is owned by George Hochman through licensee Hochman Hawaii Two, Inc. KHXM broadcasts an alternative rock format for the Honolulu radio market. The studios and offices are on Bishop Street in Honolulu.

KHXM's transmitter is sited near Mililani Cemetery Road in Pearl City. It is also heard over two low-power FM translators: K280FC (103.9 FM) in Waipahu and K284AL (104.7 FM) in Haleiwa.

== History ==
The station signed on the air as KLNI on May 2, 1990. It later switched its call sign to KIPA and KIFO, a talk outlet operated by Hawaii Public Radio from 1990 to 2002. In 2002, it went off the air and was sold to a Utah-based company.

In 2005, the broadcast license was sold to another Utah-based broadcaster which, after closing the sale in 2006, had planned to bring a Spanish language format to Honolulu. But the owner changed his mind and opted to go with a Sports radio format. By then using the call sign KUPA, it returned to the air on August 31, 2007. It used programming from Fox Sports Radio around the clock but with plans to include local content eventually.

On November 1, 2007, KUPA went off the air when it lost its transmitter site, with a brief return to maintain the license in November 2008 from a temporary site. The station resumed regular programming on March 15, 2010.

KUPA's entry into sports radio brought the number of sports talk outlets in Honolulu to three and a half. 1420 KKEA and 1500 KHKA were the other two full time sports stations, while a third one, 1180 KORL (now silent), offered sports talk in the evening hours. This type of competition is unusual, especially in a market with no major professional sport teams, in part due to geographical and financial reasons.

A Chinese-language format was observed to be in operation in mid-January 2016. KUPA went silent again in January 2020, along with its associated FM translator.

KUPA and its translator were sold to Hochman Hawaii Two, Inc. for $55,000. The call letters were changed to KHXM on September 24, 2020. The station returned to the air with an alternative rock format. While rock music is not usually heard on the AM band, the station feeds and images itself around its two translators, 103.9 in Waipahu and 104.7 in Haleiwa.
