= Visionary Related Entertainment =

Visionary Related Entertainment, LLC
- Company type: Private
- Industry: Radio Broadcasting, Media
- Founded: Honolulu, Hawaii, U.S.
- Headquarters: Visionary Related Entertainment; Honolulu, Hawaii, U.S.
- Key people: John Aeto; President; James McKeon; Vice President; Chris Hughes; Director of Operations
- Number of employees: 60+
- Divisions: Visionary Related Entertainment Maui

Visionary Related Entertainment, LLC is Hawaii's largest radio group, with four out of five of their Honolulu stations being one of the top rated stations in the state.

== Stations ==
- KAOI in Kihei, Hawaii
- KAOI-FM in Wailuku, Hawaii
- KDLX in Makawao, Hawaii
- KEWE in Kihei, Hawaii
- KHEI in Kihei, Hawaii
- KNUQ in Paaulio, Hawaii

The following stations are now owned by Ohana Broadcast Company:

- KDDB 102.7 Da Bomb
- KPOI 105.9 The Ride
- KQMQ 93.1 The Zone
- KQNG Kong 93.5
- KSHK 103.1 Shaka
- KSRF 95.9 Da Pa'ina
- KUAI AM 570
- KUMU 94.7 Hawaii's KUMU
