= KORL (AM) =

Honolulu, Hawaii; United States
- Broadcast area: Honolulu metropolitan area
- Frequency: 1180 kHz

Ownership
- Owner: James L. Primm
- Sister stations: KITH, KJMQ, KONI, KORL-FM, KPHI, KRKH, KRYL, KTOH, KQMY

History
- First air date: December 29, 1959
- Last air date: October 7, 2013
- Former call signs: KOHO (1959–2000); KNUG (2000); KBNZ (2000-01); KZEZ (2001); KBNZ (2001-02); KENT (2002-04); KJPN (2004-05); KHCN (2005-06)
- Call sign meaning: "Coral"

Technical information
- Facility ID: 13985
- Class: B
- Power: 1,000 watts (unlimited)
- Transmitter coordinates: 21°26′18″N 157°59′29″W

KORL (1180 AM) was an American radio station located in Honolulu, Hawaii. The station's broadcast license was held by James L. Primm. This was the third station in Honolulu to carry the KORL call sign, whose previous homes were at 650 and 690 AM respectively.

Long a Japanese-language station as KOHO, financial troubles silenced it after more than 33 years in 1993. It would spend 20 more years cycling through owners, call signs, and formats before last broadcasting in 2013. The license was cancelled in 2015 after the station was off the air for more than a year.

== Japanese-language KOH O ==
Windward Broadcasting Company, Limited, applied to the Federal Communications Commission (FCC) to build a new radio station at 1170 kHz on May 28, 1956, contingent on changes to station KANI, Windward's outlet at Kaneohe and using the KAIM transmission facilities at Kaimuki. Approval was granted on June 3, 1959, and the station began broadcasting on the evening of December 29. The new KOHO devoted itself to broadcasting primarily in the Japanese and Filipino languages. Windward renamed itself the Cosmopolitan Broadcasting Company in 1960, and the station was transferred to ownership by the Japanese-language Hawaii Times newspaper in 1961, with the newspaper purchasing a 51 percent stake in the firm. KOHO increased power to 5,000 watts in 1968.

Soga family control of KOHO continued for more than 25 years. However, in May 1985, the Times—the oldest Japanese-language newspaper outside of Japan—ceased publication and filed for bankruptcy. This opened the door for Honolulu attorney Warren Higa to lead a hostile takeover of KOHO by controlling the shares of the Times, electing a new slate of directors in 1986. In the late 1980s, KOHO, which had long targeted issei and nisei communities, changed its program lineup to appeal to expatriate Japanese, with news from Japan and programs geared toward younger listeners.

Shortly after the United Airlines Flight 811 incident occurred in 1989, a KOHO spokesman reported receiving a bomb threat via phone the previous month. The caller had threatened to plant a bomb on an American aircraft unless a jailed member of the Japanese Red Army was released, but investigators said there was no indication that a bomb caused the hole in the airplane's fuselage.

In 1990, the station was forced to leave the Kaimuki site and relocated to a studio in Waikiki. However, it fell behind on rent, and on May 11, 1993, the station went silent, with plans to triplex its signal with other stations halted and no place to broadcast. Its silence left KZOO the only full-time Japanese-language station on Oahu.

== Sales and Salem ownership ==
It would be a lengthy wait before KOHO returned to the air. The station, still owned by the defunct Times and general manager Harumi Oshita, was sold in 1998 to Da Kine Broadcasting for $100,000. The next year, Da Kine sold the station to Legacy Communications of St. George, Utah, as its first Hawaiian radio property. However, under Legacy, operation was intermittent. There were multiple changes of call sign, and the station was silent more than it was operating because of issues finding an appropriate transmitter site. Salem Communications purchased the station in 2004, and under the KJPN call sign, it rebroadcast the music of KAIM-FM.

The station changed its call sign to KHCM and its format to country music in 2005; the previous KHCM (940 AM) had been traded along with another station to Cox Radio to acquire its FM station. In 2006, it moved to the 1180 frequency, followed by a swap with KORL's owners, Hochman–McCain Broadcasting, for the 690 signal and $1 million.

== Final years ==
On August 18, 2008, this station was granted a construction permit to relocate to 1170 kHz, downgrade to a class D station with 330 watts of daytime power and 140 watts at night, plus relocate the broadcast transmitter southeast to 21°20'10"N, 157°53'33"W, the former KRUD (now KPHI) tower site. The new facilities, conceived to protect the FCC monitoring station at Waipahu, were not built, and the construction permit expired.

On September 23, 2008, KORL signed off the air to make way for the sign-on of sister station KPHI, whose 1130 frequency offers a better signal coverage on the island and whose construction permit was about to expire. On October 14, the FCC accepted for filing a request by KORL for special temporary authority to remain silent for technical reasons until the new transmitter site authorized by the August 2008 construction permit could be completed. The station's application stated that ownership expected KORL to be silent for only a short period of time.

On September 17, 2009, Hochman-McCain announced that it had sold KORL to Centro Cristiano Vida Abundante, a religious broadcaster from California whose programming targets a Hispanic audience. When the station returned to the air in 2010, it broadcast the Radio Vida programming produced by Vida Abundante in California, making it Hawaii's first Spanish-language radio station.

In June 2011, Centro Cristiano Vida Abundante, Inc., reached an agreement to sell KORL to James L. Primm for $37,000. The FCC approved the license transfer on July 6, 2011, and the transaction was consummated on August 8, 2011. The FCC cancelled KORL's license on May 5, 2015, due to the station having been silent for more than twelve months (since October 7, 2013). Primm had cited technical issues and lease troubles multiple times in requests for silence.
