= Kamalei Kawaʻa =

American singer

- Kawaʻa performing on NBC's The Voice

Background information
- Born: Kamalei Kawaʻa; Wailuku, Maui
- Origin: Paukūkalo, Maui, Hawaiʻi US
- Genre: Hawaiian music
- Occupations: Musician, teacher
- Instruments: Guitar, ukulele, vocals
- Years active: 2012–present
- Label: Kamalei Kawa'a Music LLC
- Formerly of: Nā Wai ʻEhā
- Spouse: Cierra Kawaʻa
- Award: 4x – Nā Hōkū Hanohano Awards Richard Hoʻopiʻi Leo Kiʻekiʻe Falsetto Contest
- Website: https://www.kamaleikawaamusic.com

Kamalei Kawaʻa is a singer, songwriter, hula dancer, chanter, scholar, teacher, and musician from Maui, Hawaiʻi. Kawaʻa is a multi Nā Hōkū Hanohano Award winner and Grammy Award nominated musician. He is best known for his award-winning Hawaiian music band, Nā Wai ʻEhā.

== Early life ==
Kawaʻa grew up in a small town called Paukūkalo on the island of Maui. He is a graduate of Ke Kula Kaiapuni Ma Maui, a K-12 Hawaiian language immersion program in Hawaiʻi and a graduate of the University of Hawaiʻi Maui College.

He is an alakaʻi (leader) in hula at Hālau Kekuaokalāʻauʻalaʻiliahi under the direction of Kumu Hula ʻIliahi and Haunani Paredes. Kawaʻa teaches hula at Seabury Hall, a private school on the island of Maui.

In 2015, Kawaʻa won the 14th Annual Richard Hoʻopiʻi Leo Kiʻekiʻe Falsetto Contest. The contest was held at the Grand Wailea Resort and hosted by KPOA's Alakaʻi Paleka. The judges included Kumu Hula Kamaka Kūkona, Kumu Hula Kuʻulei Alcomindras-Palakiko, Hawaiian musician Ata Damasco, and multi-Grammy Award musician Kalani Peʻa. Among six other contestants, the judges awarded Kawaʻa the Hawaiian Language award through his outstanding performance of Pua ʻĀhihi.

Kawaʻa was a contestant on The Voice in 2024, where he sang "Redemption Song" by Bob Marley as part of his blind audition. His opening note quickly garnered attention from Chance the Rapper and seconds later country music icon Reba McEntire, earning him a two-chair turn for his blind audition. Kawaʻa was eliminated from The Voice on April 22, 2024.

== Music career ==
=== Nā Wai ʻEha ===
Nā Wai ʻEhā winning big at the 43rd Nā Hōkū Hanohano Awards – Honolulu, Hawaiʻi. (From Left to Right: Kahikina Juan, Kalanikina Juan, Kamalei Kawaʻa, Kamaʻehu Kawaʻa)

Kawaʻa made his Hawaiian music debut with Maui Hawaiian music quartet, Nā Wai ʻEhā, in 2012. Band members included Gregory Kahikina Maxwell Juan, Edward Kalanikini Maxwell Juan, and Kawaʻa's brother, Kamaʻehu Kawaʻa. The first album, Nā Wai ʻEhā, was a self-entitled, 11-track, award-winning masterpiece. As a result, the group won the 'Most Promising Artist of the Year Award' at the 42nd Nā Hōkū Hanohano Awards in 2019.

In 2019, Nā Wai ʻEhā released their second album entitled, 'Lovely Sunrise.' In 2020, the album was awarded three Nā Hōkū Hanohano Awards at the 43rd Nā Hōkū Hanohano Awards.

In 2020, 'Lovely Sunrise' was nominated for Best Regional Roots Music Album at the 62nd Annual Grammy Awards.

=== Solo Artist ===
Following the release of their second group album, Kawaʻa went solo, releasing several singles including, Sweet Dreams Kuʻu Momi and With This Kiss. Kawaʻa was also featured on multiple Hawaiian compilation records.

In December 2025, Kawaʻa released his first solo album entitled, Mānaiakalani. A CD release party was subsequently held at the Four Seasons Resort Maui in Wailea, Hawaii on January 17, 2026. The event featured original compositions and Mele from the album and live hula from select members of Hālau Kekuaokalāʻauʻalaʻiliahi, his wife, Cierra Kawaʻa, and his mother, Kumu Hula Luana Kawaʻa.

== Awards ==
=== Grammy Awards ===
Year	Nominated Work	Category	Result	Ref
2020	Lovely Sunrise	Best Regional Roots Album	Nominated	

=== Nā Hōkū Hanohano Awards ===
Year	Nominated Work	Category	Result	Ref
2020	Lovely Sunrise	Hawaiian Language Performance	Won	
2020	Lovely Sunrise	Group of the Year	Won	
2020	Lovely Sunrise	Hawaiian Music Album of the Year	Won	
2019	Nā Wai ʻEhā	Most Promising Artist of the Year	Won	

== Discography ==
=== Group albums ===
- Nā Wai ʻEha (2018), Nā Wai ʻEhā
- Lovely Sunrise (2019), Nā Wai ʻEhā

=== Compilation albums ===
- Kulu Wai Maka (2019), Kūhaʻo Maunakea, Kanaeokana
- Nani Wale Paunau (2020), Lei Nāhonoapiʻilani: Nā Mele Hou, North Beach West Maui Benefit Fund
- Pua ʻĀhihi (2022), Hawaiian Falsetto, Vol 1., Haku Records
- ʻO Wailuku Kuʻu Pūnana Leo, Mele Pūnana Leo, Kāhuli Leo Leʻa

=== Solo albums ===
- Mānaiakalani (2025), Kamalei Kawaʻa Music LLC

=== Singles ===
- Sweet Dreams Kuʻu Momi (2021), Sugah P Records
- Paukūkalo (2022), Kāhuli Leo Leʻa
- With This Kiss (2024), Kamalei Kawaʻa Music LLC
