= KQNG =

KQNG may refer to:

- KQNG (AM), a defunct radio station (720 AM) formerly licensed to serve Kekaha, Hawaii, United States
- KQNG-FM, a radio station (93.5 FM) licensed to serve Lihue, Hawaii
- KUAI, a radio station (570 AM) licensed to serve Eleele, Hawaii, which held the call sign KQNG from 1987 to 2015
