= Kipa =

Kipa or KIPA may refer to:

- Kipa (supermarket), a Turkish supermarket chain
- alternative spelling of kippah, a type of Jewish hat

== People with the name ==
- Ming Kipa (born 1988), Nepalese Sherpa girl who climbed Mount Everest
- Rangi Kipa (born 1966), New Zealand sculptor, carver and artist
- Kipa Babu, Indian Politician

== Acronyms and Radio stations ==
- KIPA (AM), a radio station (1060 AM) licensed to serve Hilo, Hawaii, United States
- KHBC (FM), a radio station (92.7 FM) licensed to serve Hilo, Hawaii, which held the call sign KIPA in 2009
- KHNU, a radio station (620 AM) licensed to serve Hilo, Hawaii, which held the call sign KIPA from 1947 to July 2008
- Korea Institute of Public Administration, a government-sponsored research institute in South Korea
