= KAOI =

KAOI may refer to:

- KAOI (AM), a radio station (1110 AM) licensed to Kihei, Hawaii, United States
- KAOI-FM, a radio station (95.1 FM) licensed to Wailuku, Hawaii, United States
