= KHBC =

KHBC may refer to:

- KHBC (FM), an FM radio station in Hilo, Hawaii, United States
- KSIX-TV, a television station (channel 13 virtual/22 digital) licensed to Hilo, Hawaii, a satellite station of KHNL, which held the call sign KHBC-TV from 1986 to 2020
- KIPA (AM), a radio station (1060 AM) licensed to Hilo, Hawaii, which held the call sign KHBC from 2003 to 2009
