= KQMY =

KQMY may refer to:

- KQMY (FM), a radio station (102.1 FM) licensed to serve Paia, Hawaii, United States
- KMKV (FM), a radio station (100.7 FM) licensed to serve Kihei, Hawaii, United States, which held the call sign KQMY from 2015 to 2017
- KMGW (FM), a radio station (99.3 FM) licensed to serve Naches, Washington, United States, which held the call sign KQMY from 2008 to 2012
