= KCOF =

KCOF may refer to:

- KCOF-LP, a defunct low-power radio station (102.5 FM) formerly licensed to Captain Cook, Hawaii, United States
- the ICAO code for Patrick Space Force Base
