= KMKV =

KMKV may refer to:

- KMKV (FM), a radio station (100.7 FM) licensed to serve Kihei, Hawaii, United States
- KQMY (FM), a radio station (102.1 FM) licensed to serve Paia, Hawaii, which held the call sign KMKV from 2013 to 2017
