= KEWE =

KEWE may refer to:

- KEWE (AM), a radio station (1240 AM) licensed to serve Kahului, Hawaii, United States
- KPYV, a radio station (1340 AM) licensed to serve Oroville, California, United States, which held the call sign KEWE from 2000 to 2013
- KHHZ, a radio station (97.7 FM) licensed to serve Gridley, California, which held the call sign KEWE from 1979 to 1996
