= Alakaʻi Paleka =

Leslyn Mililani "Alakaʻi" Paleka
- Alakaʻi "The Morning Goddess" Paleka
- Born: January 12, 1957 (age 69)
- Education: Kamehameha Schools
- Parent(s): Daniel "Bully" Paleka, Sr.
- Awards: Best Local Radio DJ on Maui
- Presenting career
- Stations: KPOA, KAPA
- Network: Pacific Media Group
- Time slot: Morning

Leslyn Mililani "Alakaʻi" Paleka (born January 12, 1957) is an actress, singer, recording artist, emcee, and prominent radio personality on the Hawaiian island of Maui. She is best known for her morning radio show on KPOA 93.5 where she earned the nickname, "The Morning Goddess."

== Personal life ==
Paleka's father, Daniel, was a Marine veteran of the Korean War who died in June 2006 at age 72. He was an entertainer and member of the Hawaii Association of Recording Artists.

== Radio ==
=== KPOA 93.5FM ===
Alakaʻi Paleka is best known for her radio personality on the Maui Hawaiian music radio station KPOA 93.5FM. She was the first show of the day on the radio station and was therefore given the Hawaiian name, "Alakaʻi", which means leader or to lead. Her jovial personality captured the island of Maui and soon she was given the nickname, "The Morning Goddess." She retired from KPOA in 2019.

=== KAPA 99.1FM ===
Following her retirement from KPOA in 2019, Paleka moved to the Hawaiʻi (island). There she joined with KPOA sister station, KAPA 99.1FM. The station plays similar Hawaiian music programming to that of KPOA.

== Emcee and live events ==
In addition to her work in radio and broadcasting, Paleka has served as an emcee and host for numerous public, cultural, entertainment, and community events throughout Hawaiʻi. Her work as a master of ceremonies has included festivals, concerts, cultural celebrations, community gatherings, and other special events across the islands.

Paleka's longtime presence in Hawaii media has made live event hosting a significant part of her public career. As an emcee, she has introduced performers, conducted onstage interviews, presented awards, and guided live programs featuring Hawaiian musicians, entertainers, cultural practitioners, and community organizations.

Her emcee work has also placed her alongside multiple generations of Hawaii entertainers and musicians, particularly at events celebrating Hawaiian music and culture. She has regularly served as a link between performers and audiences, combining her broadcasting experience with familiarity wth Hawaiʻi's local music and entertainment community.

Among the events Paleka has emceed is the Richard Hoʻopiʻi Leo Kiʻekiʻe Falsetto Contest on Maui, a competition honoring Hawaiian musician Richard Hoʻopiʻi and the tradition of Hawaiian falsetto singing, or leo kiʻekiʻe.

=== Past Emcee Events ===
Event	Description
Maui County Fair	Paleka was a recurring presence at the fair and emceed entertainment programming. She also announced and coordinated the Maui Healthy Baby Contest.
Festivals of Aloha	Festivals of Aloha encompasses events on Maui, Molokaʻi, Lānaʻi, and Hāna including concerts, hoʻolauleʻa, parades, royal court events, and the Richard Hoʻopiʻi Leo Kiʻekiʻe Falsetto Contest.
Maui AgFest & 4H Livestock Fair	Paleka has emceed the event's entertainment stage for a number of years.
Celebration of the Arts at the Ritz-Carlton Maui, Kapalua	She served as emcee for the festival's Island Tastes celebration, which combines Hawaiian food, music, hula, arts, and cultural pogramming.
Kūlaia on Molokaʻi	In 2017, Paleka and long-time radio colleague, Ke'van Dudoit, served as emcees for the Molokaʻi Canoe Festivals event associated with Nā Wāhine O Ke Kai. Performers included Keauhou, Raiatea Helm, Blayne Asing, and Henry Kapono.
Queen Kaʻahumanu Center 50th Anniversary Celebration	Paleka emceed the center's 50th anniversary entertainment in 2022, featuring Kamalei Kawaʻa, Halemanu, Josh Kahula, and the Kamehameha Schools Middle School ʻUkulele Band.
Sacred Hearts School 160th Anniversary Celebration	Paleka served as emcee and host for the school's 160th-anniversary event in Lahaina, Hawaii in 2022.
We Are Friends Maui Wildfire Benefit Concert	Paleka and Shane Kahalehau emceed the 2023 benefit at the Maui Arts & Cultural Center. The lineup included Henry Kapono, Robert Cazimero, Brother Noland, Mick Fleetwood, Jake Shimabukuro, Amy Hānaialiʻi Gilliom, Kalani Peʻa, Kimié and others.
Puana Aloha Nō Lahaina	Paleka emceed this 2024 Lahaina, Hawaii community tribute, which brought together musicians and community members for an evening commemorating Lahaina following the deadly 2023 wildfire.

=== Other Emcee Work ===
- Kāʻanapali Beach Hotel Mother's Day Celebration
- Hula O Nā Keiki
- Nā Mele Song Competition
- Hot Kūpuna Nights
- Merrie Monarch Festival
- Made in Maui County Festival

== Other work ==
Paleka was cast in the comedy film Ho'olawe: Give and Take, which completed about two-thirds of its shooting days before production was canceled in 2000 due to financing issues.

Paleka was a staple at the Maui County Fair where she emceed the fair's entertainment. She announced and coordinated the Maui County Healthy Baby Contest.

== Awards ==
Maui Time newspaper named Paleka the best local radio DJ each year from 2006 to 2011.

== Filmography ==
=== Film ===
Year	Title	Role	Director(s)	Ref.
2001	Hoʻolawe: Give and Take	"Bernie"	Michael Wurth	
2011	Get a Job!	N/A	Brian Kohne	
