= KAUI =

KAUI may refer to:

- KAUI-LP, a defunct low-power television station (channel 51) formerly licensed to Wailuku, Hawaii, United States
- KSHK, a radio station (103.3 FM) licensed to Kekaha, Hawaii, which held the call sign KAUI from September 1989 to March 1999
