= KZZV =

KZZV may refer to:

- Zanesville Municipal Airport (ICAO code KZZV)
- KHKU, a radio station (94.3 FM) licensed to serve Hanapepe, Hawaii, United States, which held the call sign KZZV from 2014 to 2018
