= KMKK =

KMKK may refer to:

- KMKK-FM, a defunct radio station (105.5 FM) formerly licensed to serve Tecopa, California, United States
- KKHI (FM), a radio station (102.3 FM) licensed to serve Kaunakakai, Hawaii, United States, which held the call sign KMKK-FM from 2006 to 2015
