= KAOE =

KAOE may refer to:

- KAOE-LD, a low-power television station (channel 14, virtual 22) licensed to serve Santa Fe, New Mexico, United States; see List of television stations in New Mexico
- KHBC (FM), a radio station (92.7 FM) licensed to serve Hilo, Hawaii, United States, which held the call sign KAOE from 1991 to 1996
