= KHWI =

- Holualoa, Hawaii; United States
- Broadcast area: Hawai'i
- Frequency: 92.1 MHz

Programming
- Format: Adult top 40

Ownership
- Owner: Resonate Broadcasting; (Resonate Hawaii, LLC)
- Sister stations: KHBC, KWYI, KTBH-FM

History
- Former call signs: KHWA (2007), KIPA (2008)
- Call sign meaning: Hawaii

Technical information
- Licensing authority: FCC
- Facility ID: 164211
- Class: C1
- ERP: 4,500 watts
- HAAT: 949 meters
- Transmitter coordinates: 19°43′15″N 155°55′16″W
- Repeater: 92.7 FM KHBC (Hilo)

Links
- Public license information: Public file; LMS
- Webcast: Listen live
- Website: hawaiiswave.com

KHWI (92.1 FM), is a radio station in Holualoa, Hawaii broadcasting an Adult Top 40 format. Prior to October 2012, the station simulcasted co-owned KIPA and KHBC. KIPA has since become an affiliate of CSN International, but the KHBC simulcast is still active as of May 2026.

The station is currently owned by Resonate Hawaii, LLC., a division of Australia-based Resonate Broadcasting.

The station has a broadcast area covering most of The Big Island and may also be heard in Maui's southern coast.
