= KNWB =

Radio station in Hilo, Hawaii

- Hilo, Hawaii; United States
- Broadcast area: Hilo, Hawaii
- Frequency: 97.1 MHz
- Branding: B97

Programming
- Format: Classic hits

Ownership
- Owner: New West Broadcasting Corporation
- Sister stations: KAOY, KMWB, KPUA, KWXX-FM

History
- First air date: August 3, 1985
- Former call signs: KFSH (1985–1995)
- Call sign meaning: New West Broadcasting

Technical information
- Licensing authority: FCC
- Facility ID: 69054
- Class: C2
- ERP: 38,000 watts
- HAAT: -251 meters
- Transmitter coordinates: 19°46′49.3″N 155°05′15.8″W
- Repeater: KMWB

Links
- Public license information: Public file; LMS
- Webcast: Listen Live
- Website: www.b97hawaii.com

KNWB (97.1 FM) is a radio station in Hilo, Hawaii broadcasting a classic hits format. The station is currently owned by New West Broadcasting Corporation. KNWB and sister station KMWB form a simulcast to reach all of the Big Island.

== History ==
=== KFSH ===
On May 3, 1976, the Christian Broadcasting Association, a branch of the Billy Graham Evangelistic Association and owner of KAIM-AM-FM in Honolulu, filed for a construction permit for a new radio station at 97.1 MHz to serve Hilo. The Federal Communications Commission granted the permit on April 28, 1977. The station took the call letters KFSH and was mentioned as a development project for the ministry in KAIM's fundraising appeals. However, KFSH's sign-on was continually delayed, in part because the station needed the Hawaii Land Use Commission to approve its request to build its tower.

Even though a studio location had been secured and fitted out upstairs from a Christian book store, tower site issues continued to hold up completion. The tower site north of Kaiwiki Church was dedicated on December 15, 1984, and test transmissions commenced on July 25, 1985 ahead of an August 3 launch, more than eight years after the permit was issued and after 17 extensions and modifications to the construction permit.

Two years after putting KFSH on the air, the Christian Broadcasting Association spun the station off to the Pacific & Asia Christian University, later known as the University of the Nations.

=== KNWB ===
In July 1995, New West Broadcasting Corporation, owned by John Leonard, announced it would buy KFSH from the university and take over operations via a time brokerage agreement on August 1. Leonard paid $270,000 for the station, which was University of the Nations' lone broadcast outlet. New West, which already owned KWXX and KPUA, did not buy $60,000 in KFSH studio equipment, which allowed the university to donate it to Hilo Christian Broadcasting; that group then started up KCIF.

When New West took over, 97.1 FM changed to a secular operation as "The Wave"; after the closing of the sale, new KNWB call letters were chosen. The Wave aired a smooth jazz format. Two years later, the station adopted its present classic hits format as "B97".

KNWB lured D.C. Carlson from KKBG to do B97's first live morning show in December 2001; previously, the station had been entirely voice tracked. B97 became an island-wide radio station in 2007 when Captain Cook Broadcasting, the winner of an auction for an FM station at 93.1 in West Hawaii, entered into a marketing agreement to simulcast KNWB as KMWB. KMWB was sold to New West in 2010.
