= Richard Hoʻopiʻi Leo Kiʻekiʻe Falsetto Contest =

- Also known as: Leo Kiʻekiʻe Falsetto Contest
- Presented by: Alakaʻi Paleka; Luana Kawaʻa
- Judges: Alika Asing; Cody Pueo Pata; Hailama Farden; ʻIkaika Blackburn; Iwalani Hoʻomanawanui Apo; Jonah Kahanuola Solatorio; Kamaka Kukona; Kiʻope Raymond; Kuʻulei Alcomindras-Palakiko; Uluwehi Guerrero; Zachary Alakaʻi Lum

Production
- Executive producer: Daryl Fujiwara (2005–2026)

The Richard Hoʻopiʻi Leo Kiʻekiʻe Falsetto Contest is an annual Hawaiian falsetto singing competition held on the island of Maui, Hawai'i. The contest celebrates and perpetuates the Hawaiian vocal tradition of leo kiʻekiʻe ("high voice"), a style of falsetto singing closely associated with Hawaiian music.

Named in honor of Maui musician and falsetto singer Richard Hoʻopiʻi, the competition provides a venue for singers to perform traditional and contemporary Hawaiian music while showcasing the distinctive vocal techniques associated with Hawaiian falsetto. Hoʻopiʻi, together with his brother Solomon Hoʻopiʻi, was widely known as part of the musical duo The Hoʻopiʻi Brothers.

The contest is intended both as a competition and as a means of preserving and perpetuating Hawaiian musical traditions. Contestants are evaluated on elements of their vocal performance and presentation, with an emphasis on the use of Hawaiian falsetto.

== History ==
The Richard Hoʻopiʻi Leo Kiʻekiʻe Falsetto Contest was established on Maui to honor the musical legacy of Richard Hoʻopiʻi and to encourage the continuation of Hawaiian falsetto singing among new generations of performers.

The event developed as part of broader efforts within Hawaii to preserve leo kiʻekiʻe and recognize practitioners of the distinctive Hawaiian falsetto tradition. Over the years, the competition has features singers from Maui an elsewhere in Hawaii and has provided emerging performers with an opportunity to participate in a musical tradition passed between generations.

== Richard Hoʻopiʻi ==
The Hoʻopiʻi Brothers. Solomon (left) and Richard (right) Hoʻopiʻi. Source: National Endowment for the Arts.

Richard Hoʻopiʻi was a Hawaiian musician from Maui best known for his distinctive falsetto voice and his performances with his brother Solomon as the Hoʻopiʻi Brothers. Their music incorporated Hawaiian-language songs, traditional vocal techniques, and the characteristic falsetto style for which Richard became particularly recognized.

Throughout his career, Hoʻopiʻi received recognition for his contributions to Hawaiian music. He was a multiple Nā Hōkū Hanohano Award winner and was also honored with a Nā Hōkū Hanohano Award Lifetime Achievement Award, recognizing his influence and contributions to the preservation and perpetuation of Hawaiian music. In 1996, both Richard and his brother, Solomon, were inducted as National Endowment for the Arts National Heritage Fellowship.

The contest continues that legacy by providing a venue for singers to perform Hawaiian music and demonstrate the falsetto techniques associated with leo kiʻekiʻe, connecting Hoʻopiʻi's musical contributions with subsequent generations of Hawaiian performers.

== Leo Kiʻekiʻe ==
Leo kiʻekiʻe is a Hawaiian term commonly translated as "high voice" and refers to the falsetto vocal tradition found in Hawaiian music. The style is characterized by singing in the upper vocal register, and techniques developed within Hawaiian musical traditions.

Falsetto singing became a prominent element of Hawaiian popular and traditional music and has been associated with numerous influential Hawaiian musicians. The tradition has historically been transmitted through families, teachers, and musical communities.

The Richard Hoʻopiʻi contest focuses specifically on maintaining this traditional through live performance and competition.

== Cultural Significance ==
The Richard Hoʻopiʻi Leo Kiʻekiʻe Falsetto Contest forms part of ongoing efforts to perpetuate Hawaiian music and cultural practices on Maui. By creating a public venue specifically for falsetto performance, the competition encourages musicians to study Hawaiian repertoire, language, vocal technique, and performance traditions.

The contest also commemorates Richard Hoʻopiʻi's contribution to Hawaiian music while connecting his musical legacy with subsequent generations of Hawaiian falsetto singers.

== Contestants ==
=== 2026 ===
Year	Place	Contestant	Song Choice	Representing	Ref
2026	—N/a	Mākoa Puaʻoi	"Kuʻu Lei Hūlili"	Kula, Hawaii	
2026	—N/a	Yuto Maezawa	"Kupa Landing"	Kyoto, Japan	
2026	—N/a	Krissan Kama	"Kauaʻi Beauty"	Kīhei, Hawaii	
2026	3	Talan Kūaliʻi Akina-Chong	"ʻOhuʻohu Keʻanae"	Kahului, Hawaii	
2026	—N/a	Royden Kahaʻi Sato Jr.	"Ka Uluwehi O Ke Kai"	Wailuku, Hawaii	
2026	1	Kepa Revelle-ʻAikala	"Kowali"	Pukalani, Hawaii	
2026	2	Kūhaʻokealiʻikauʻikamāʻamaʻama John Murray	"He Aloha Nō ʻO Waiʻanae"	Lahaina, Hawaii	

=== 2025 ===
Year	Place	Contestant	Song Choice	Representing	Ref
2025	—N/a	Kānoa Severson	"Waiulu"	Lahaina, Hawaii	
2025	1	Koakāne Mattos	"Kalamaʻula"	Makawao, Hawaii	
2025	2	Royden Kahaʻi Sato, Jr.	"Kilakila ʻO Maui"	Wailuku, Hawaii	
2025	3	Itsuki Ezawa	"Kīhei"	Chiba, Japan	
2025	—N/a	Krissan Kama	"Nani Wale Ka Lau Oliva"	Kīhei, Hawaii	

=== Past Contest Winners ===
Year	Contestant	Song Choice	Representing	Ref
2026	Kepa Revelle-ʻAikala	"He Aloha Nō ʻO Waiʻanae"	Lahaina, Hawaii	
2025	Koakāne Mattos	"Kalamaʻula"	Makawao, Hawaii	
2024	Antonio Robles	"Waikaloa"	Wailuku, Hawaii	
2023	Liam Moleta	"Aloha Nō Kahului"	Honolulu, Hawaii	
2022	Heuaʻohu Sai-Dudoit	"Kalamaʻula"	Hilo, Hawaii	
2021	Kamaʻehu Kawaʻa		Waiheʻe-Waiehu, Hawaii	
2020				
2019	ʻIkaika Mendez	"Nani Venuse"	Ulupalakua, Hawaii	
2018	Kaulike Pescaia	"Hoʻokipa Pāka"	Kīhei, Hawaii	
2017	Kason Gomes	"Pauoa Liko Ka Lehua"	Wailuku, Hawaii	
2016	Gregory James Kahikinamaikalani Maxwell Juan	"Nāwiliwili"	Wailuku, Hawaii	
2015	Kamalei Kawaʻa		Waiheʻe-Waiehu, Hawaii	
2014	Grant Kono		Honolulu, Hawaii	
2013	Micah Hoapili Kūʻaimoku De Aguiar		Kailua-Kona, Hawaii	
2012	Joshua Noʻeau Kalima		Hilo, Hawaii	
2011	Ezra Kaui Krueger		Lahaina, Hawaii	
2010	Poʻokela Wood		Wailuku, Hawaii	
2009	Pōmaikaʻi Krueger		Lahaina, Hawaii	
2008	Kamakani Kīʻaha		Molokaʻi, Hawaii	
2007	Kapono Nāʻiliʻili		Honolulu, Hawaii	
2006	Kalani Benanua		Lānaʻi City, Hawaii	
2005	Hiroshi Okada		Tokyo, Japan	
2004	Kai Hoʻopiʻi	"ʻOhuʻohu Kahakuloa"	Wailuku, Hawaii	
2003	Kamakakēhau Fernandez		Pāʻia, Hawaii	
2002	Ramzey Hoʻopiʻi		Wailuku, Hawaii	
