= KCIF =

Radio station in Hilo, Hawaii

- Hilo, Hawaii; United States
- Frequency: 90.3 MHz
- Branding: Effect Radio

Programming
- Format: Christian rock
- Affiliations: Effect Radio

Ownership
- Owner: CSN International

History
- First air date: 1998
- Call sign meaning: Keep Christ in Focus

Technical information
- Licensing authority: FCC
- Facility ID: 81518
- Class: A
- ERP: 5,000 watts
- HAAT: -40.2 meters
- Transmitter coordinates: 19°38′14″N 155°3′19″W

Links
- Public license information: Public file; LMS
- Webcast: Listen Live
- Website: effectradio.com

KCIF (90.3 FM) is a radio station in Hilo, Hawaii. The station is owned by CSN International and airs a Christian rock format as an affiliate of Effect Radio.

== History ==
KCIF is the spiritual successor to another Hilo Christian radio station, KFSH at 97.1 MHz. That station, owned by the University of the Nations, was sold in July 1995 and became secular KNWB. As a result, Hilo Christian Broadcasting was formed, airing programming on KPUA (670 AM) and receiving a $60,000 equipment donation from the former KFSH. The changeover also required Hilo Christian to find new studio space. KCIF began broadcasting in 1998.

Effective May 22, 2020, Hilo Christian Broadcasting sold KCIF to Calvary Chapel of Twin Falls, owner of the CSN International network, for $25,000. The station is presently silent as part of relocation of its transmitter site.
