= KSRR (FM) =

- Makawao, Hawaii; United States
- Broadcast area: Maui, Hawaii
- Frequency: 94.3 MHz
- Branding: Star 94.3

Programming
- Language: English
- Format: Adult contemporary
- Affiliations: ABC News Radio; Compass Media Networks; United Stations Radio Networks

Ownership
- Owner: Akamai Broadcasting; (Akamai Broadcasting of Hawaii, LLC)
- Sister stations: KAOI; KEWE; KHEI-FM; KIXK; KNUQ

History
- First air date: 1980; 46 years ago
- Former call signs: KVIB (1980–1990); KDLX (1990–2024)
- Call sign meaning: "Star"

Technical information
- Licensing authority: FCC
- Facility ID: 14699
- Class: C1
- ERP: 2,000 watts horizontal
- HAAT: 933.1 meters (3,061 ft)
- Transmitter coordinates: 20°46′19.4″N 156°14′38.8″W

Links
- Public license information: Public file; LMS
- Webcast: Listen live
- Website: star943.com

KSRR (94.3 MHz, "Star 94.3") is an FM radio station licensed to Makawao, Hawaii. Owned by Akamai Broadcasting, it carries an adult contemporary format. It flips to Christmas Music during November and December.

== History ==
The station went on the air as KVIB on February 19, 1980. On August 17, 1990, the station changed its call sign to KDLX.

In 2024, Visionary Related Entertainment sold all of its Maui stations to Akamai Broadcasting, a company owned by KHKU's managing partner Larry Fuss. On December 9, 2024, as part of a format realignment of the acquired stations, the station flipped to adult contemporary as Star 94.3 under new callsign KSRR.
