= KSRF =

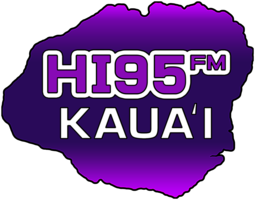
- Poipu, Hawaii; United States
- Frequency: 95.9 MHz
- Branding: HI95

Programming
- Format: Hawaiian contemporary hit radio

Ownership
- Owner: Pacific Media Group; (Pacific Radio Group, Inc.)

History
- First air date: September 2000

Technical information
- Licensing authority: FCC
- Facility ID: 39136
- Class: C1
- ERP: 51 watts (horiz.); 13 watts (vert.)
- HAAT: 60 meters (200 ft)
- Translator: 103.9 K280EZ (Princeville)

Links
- Public license information: Public file; LMS
- Website: hi95kauai.com

KSRF (95.9 FM) "HI95" is a radio station broadcasting a Hawaiian contemporary hit radio format.

Licensed to Poipu, Hawaii, United States, the station serves the island of Kauaʻi at 95.9 FM and the island's North Shore with a translator at 103.9 FM from Princeville, and also streams Kauai's Local Hits online at www.hi95kauai.com.

The station uses the branding "HI95 - Today's Island Hits" and is currently owned by Pacific Media Group Hawaii since October 2018. Pacific Media Group's Kauai Office and studios are located on Halenani Street in Lihue, Kauai. PMG's Kauai stations also include KUAI Country, Shaka Rocks 103, and KQNG Radio.
