= KEWE (AM) =

Radio station in Kahului, Hawaii

KWOE
- Kahului, Hawaii; United States
- Broadcast area: Maui, Hawaii
- Frequency: 1240 kHz
- Branding: Wowie 97.9

Programming
- Format: Oldies
- Affiliations: Compass Media Networks

Ownership
- Owner: Akamai Broadcasting; (Akamai Broadcasting of Hawaii, LLC)
- Sister stations: KAOI, KHEI-FM, KIXK, KNUQ, KSRR

History
- First air date: February 10, 2015

Technical information
- Licensing authority: FCC
- Facility ID: 161045
- Class: B
- Power: 5,000 watts
- Transmitter coordinates: 20°49′21.0″N 156°27′15.0″W
- Translator: 97.9 K250CC (Kihei)

Links
- Public license information: Public file; LMS
- Webcast: Listen live
- Website: www.akamaidailynews.com/wowie979/

KWOE (1240 kHz, "Wowie 97.9") is an AM radio station licensed to the city of Kahului, Hawaii. Owned by Akamai Broadcasting, it carries an oldies format.

== History ==
Its first license was granted by the FCC on February 10, 2015. New 5,000 watt AM radio stations are unusual in 2015; frequencies on the AM band are scarce.

The station previously carried a Hawaiian music format as The Spirit. In 2024, Visionary Related Entertainment sold all of its Maui stations to Akamai Broadcasting. On December 9, 2024, the station flipped to oldies as Wowie 97.9.
