= KNUI =

Radio station in Wailuku, Hawaii

- Wailuku, Hawaii; United States
- Broadcast area: Maui
- Frequency: 550 kHz
- Branding: K-Country

Programming
- Format: Country

Ownership
- Owner: Pacific Radio Group, Inc.
- Sister stations: KJKS, KJMD, KLHI-FM, KMVI, KPOA

History
- First air date: March 17, 1947
- Former call signs: KMVI (1947–2013)

Technical information
- Licensing authority: FCC
- Facility ID: 49956
- Class: B
- Power: 5,000 watts
- Transmitter coordinates: 20°47′18.8″N 156°27′51″W
- Translator: 106.1 K291CZ (Wailuku)

Links
- Public license information: Public file; LMS
- Website: kcountrymaui.com

KNUI (550 AM) is a commercial radio station licensed to Wailuku, Hawaii, United States, and serving the island of Maui. Owned by Pacific Radio Group, Inc., it broadcasts a country music format. Studios and offices are located on Ano Street in Kahului, Hawaii.

Programming is also heard on FM translator K291CZ at 106.1 MHz in Wailuku.

== History ==
The station signed on the air on March 17, 1947. The original call sign was KMVI. It was an affiliate of the CBS Radio Network. In the 1950s, as network programming moved from radio to television, KMVI had a full service, middle of the road format of popular adult music, news and sports.

By the 1980s, as most music listening switched from AM to FM radio, KMVI became a talk radio station, known as "The Talk of Maui." It switched its call sign to KNUI in 2013.

After three months of being silent, KNUI re-branded as "K-Country" and returned to the air on July 2, 2020. The new station has a playlist of mainstream country artists from different years along with Hawaiian country singers. Additionally, FM translator 106.1 K291CZ was added to compete with rival country station KRYL 106.5 FM.
