= KJKS =

- Kahului, Hawaii; United States
- Broadcast area: Maui County, Hawaii
- Frequency: 99.9 MHz
- Branding: 99.9 Kiss FM

Programming
- Format: Adult contemporary

Ownership
- Owner: Pacific Radio Group, Inc.
- Sister stations: KJMD, KLHI-FM, KMVI, KNUI, KPOA

History
- First air date: 1984-02-01 (as KHUI)
- Former call signs: KHUI (1984–1990); KNUI-FM (1990–2005)

Technical information
- Licensing authority: FCC
- Facility ID: 9674
- Class: C
- ERP: 72,000 watts
- HAAT: 696 meters
- Transmitter coordinates: 20°39′36.00″N 156°21′50.00″W

Links
- Public license information: Public file; LMS
- Webcast: Listen Live
- Website: kissfmmaui.com

KJKS (99.9 FM) is a radio station broadcasting an adult contemporary format. Licensed to serve Kahului, Hawaii, United States, the station is currently owned by Pacific Radio Group, Inc.

== History ==
The station went on the air as KHUI on 1984-02-01. On 1990-03-09, the station changed its call sign to KNUI-FM and, on 2005-02-01, to the current KJKS.
