= KQNG-FM =

Radio station in Lihue, Hawaii

- Lihue, Hawaii; United States
- Broadcast area: Kauaʻi, Hawaii
- Frequency: 93.5 MHz
- Branding: Kong 93.5

Programming
- Format: Contemporary hit radio

Ownership
- Owner: Pacific Media Group; (Pacific Radio Group, Inc.)

History
- First air date: January 21, 1980 (as KPOY)
- Former call signs: KPOY (1980–1982); KIPO-FM (1982–1987)

Technical information
- Licensing authority: FCC
- Facility ID: 58937
- Class: C1
- ERP: 51,000 watts horizontal; 13,000 watts vertical
- HAAT: 60.0 meters (196.9 ft)
- Transmitter coordinates: 21°59′31″N 159°24′21″W
- Translators: 105.5 K288HK (Hanalei); 105.5 K288GJ (Eleele)

Links
- Public license information: Public file; LMS
- Website: kongradio.com

KQNG-FM (93.5 FM) is a radio station broadcasting a contemporary hit radio format. Licensed to Lihue, Hawaii, United States, the station serves the Kauaʻi area. The station is currently owned by Pacific Media Group. PMG's Kauaʻi stations also include KUAI Country, Shaka Rocks 103, and HI95 Kauaʻi.

== History ==
The station went on the air as KPOY on January 21, 1980. On October 21, 1982, the station changed its call sign to KIPO-FM and on March 31, 1987, to the current KQNG-FM.
