= KJMD =

- Pukalani, Hawaii; United States
- Broadcast area: Maui
- Frequency: 98.3 MHz
- Branding: Da Jam 98.3

Programming
- Format: Contemporary hit radio

Ownership
- Owner: Pacific Radio Group, Inc.
- Sister stations: KJKS, KLHI-FM, KMVI, KNUI, KPOA

History
- First air date: 1984-04-05 (as KMVI-FM)
- Former call signs: KMVI-FM (1984–2002)

Technical information
- Licensing authority: FCC
- Facility ID: 49958
- Class: C1
- ERP: 9,400 watts
- HAAT: 703 meters
- Transmitter coordinates: 20°39′36″N 156°21′50″W

Links
- Public license information: Public file; LMS
- Webcast: Listen Live
- Website: dajam983.com

KJMD (98.3 FM) is a radio station broadcasting a contemporary hit radio format, licensed to Pukalani, Hawaii, United States. The station is owned by Pacific Radio Group, Inc.

== History ==
The station went on the air as KMVI-FM on 1984-04-05. On 11 February 2002, the station changed its call sign to the current KJMD.

Previous logo
