= KQNG (AM) =

Radio station in Kekaha, Hawaii (1965–2016)

- Kekaha, Hawaii; United States
- Broadcast area: Kauai
- Frequency: 720 kHz

Ownership
- Owner: Ohana Broadcast Company LLC

History
- First air date: June 20, 1965
- Last air date: March 22, 2016
- Former call signs: KUAI (1965–2015)

Technical information
- Facility ID: 1752
- Class: B
- Power: 5,000 watts (unlimited)
- Transmitter coordinates: 21°53′37″N 159°33′27″W

KQNG (720 AM) was a radio station broadcasting a classic country format. Licensed to Kekaha, Hawaii, United States, the station served the Kauai area. The station was owned by Ohana Broadcast Company LLC and featured programming from CNN Radio.

== History ==
The station went on the air as KUAI on June 20, 1965. At the time, its tower was the westernmost in the United States, on land owned by the McBryde Sugar Company. It was owned by the American Islands Broadcasting Corporation, which was a business of Richard Hobby and Ron Gay. Charles T. Erickson bought the station in late 1966; he sold it to John Short and William Dale in 1975.

KQNG's license was surrendered on March 22, 2016, and cancelled by the Federal Communications Commission on the same day.
