= KAHU (FM) =

Radio station in Hawaii

- Pahala, Hawaii; United States
- Broadcast area: Southern Hawaiʻi, Hawaii
- Frequency: 91.3 MHz
- Branding: Hawaii Public Radio

Programming
- Format: Classical music
- Affiliations: Hawaii Public Radio, Inc.

History
- First air date: June 28, 2010
- Former frequencies: 91.7 MHz (2010–2016)

Technical information
- Licensing authority: FCC
- Facility ID: 173928
- Class: C2
- ERP: 18,000 watts horizontal
- HAAT: 219.8 meters (721 ft)
- Transmitter coordinates: 19°31′14″N 155°17′58″W

Links
- Public license information: Public file; LMS
- Webcast: Listen live
- Website: hawaiipublicradio.org

KAHU (91.3 FM) is a noncommercial educational radio station licensed to Pahala, Hawaii, United States, on the island of Hawaiʻi. It airs classical music as part of the Hawaii Public Radio network.

== History ==
KAHU started broadcasting as a community radio station on June 28, 2010. The station later experienced financial trouble and was sold to Hawaii Public Radio on August 5, 2013. It began broadcasting again on November 6, 2013, airing Hawaii Public Radio's HPR-2 programming.

On February 14, 2017 KAHU changed their format from HPR 2's news, talk and jazz service to HPR 2's classical music service, as part of Hawaii Public Radio's realignment of its program services.

== Construction permit ==
KAHU had a construction permit to move its antenna to a higher location, increase its power, and change frequency from 91.7 to 91.3 MHz. The license for this new facility was issued on October 21, 2016.
