= KHEI-FM =

Radio station in Kihei, Hawaii

- Kihei, Hawaii; United States
- Broadcast area: Maui, Hawaii
- Frequency: 107.5 MHz
- Branding: 107.5 The Buzz

Programming
- Format: Classic hits
- Affiliations: United Stations Radio Networks

Ownership
- Owner: Visionary Related Entertainment, LLC
- Sister stations: KAOI, KIXK, KKHI, KNUQ, KSRR

History
- First air date: 2009
- Call sign meaning: KiHEI, its city of license

Technical information
- Licensing authority: FCC
- Facility ID: 170177
- Class: C2
- ERP: 750 watts
- HAAT: 955 meters (3,133 ft)
- Transmitter coordinates: 20°50′48″N 156°19′35″W
- Repeater: 107.5 KHEI-FM1 (Lahaina)

Links
- Public license information: Public file; LMS
- Webcast: Listen live
- Website: www.akamaidailynews.com/1075thebuzz/

KHEI-FM (107.5 MHz) is a radio station that broadcasts classic hits. It is licensed to Kihei, Hawaii, United States. The station is currently owned by Visionary Related Entertainment, LLC.

== History ==
KHEI signed on the air on April 30, 2009, with a Hawaiian contemporary/reggae format branded as "Island 107.5".

On April 1, 2016, KHEI changed their format from Hawaiian contemporary/reggae to classic hits, branded as "Buzz 107.5".
