= KLUU =

Wahiawa, Hawaii; United States
- Broadcast area: Honolulu, Hawaii
- Frequency: 103.5 MHz (HD Radio)
- Branding: 103.5 KLUU K-Love Hawaii

Programming
- Language: English
- Format: Contemporary Christian music
- Subchannels: HD2: Air1; HD3: K-Love 90s
- Network: K-Love

Ownership
- Owner: Educational Media Foundation
- Sister stations: KAIM-FM

History
- First air date: 2007
- Former call signs: KKHI (2005); KHAI (2005–2015)
- Call sign meaning: "K-Love Honolulu"

Technical information
- Licensing authority: FCC
- Facility ID: 164206
- Class: C
- ERP: 100,000 watts (Horizontal polarization); 86,490 watts (Vertical polarization)
- HAAT: 597 meters (1,959 ft)
- Transmitter coordinates: 21°23′51″N 158°06′01″W
- Translator: See § Translators

Links
- Public license information: Public file; LMS
- Webcast: Listen Live; Listen Live (HD2); Listen Live (HD3)
- Website: klove.com air1.com (HD2)

KLUU (103.5 FM) is a radio station licensed to Wahiawa, Hawaii, and serving the Honolulu metropolitan area. It broadcasts a contemporary Christian radio format. It is owned by the Educational Media Foundation and carries the K-Love Network.

KLUU has an effective radiated power (ERP) of 100,000 watts (horizontal polarization) and 86,490 watts (vertical polarization).^ It may be operating on an auxiliary power of 85,000 watts ERP. The transmitter is off Palehua Road, amid the towers for other Honolulu-area FM and TV stations. It also operates FM translator stations on 104.7 in Haleiwa and 105.5 in Honolulu.

== History ==
Under Kona Coast Radio, KLUU applied for a construction permit as KKHI in February 2005 (superseded by a September transaction that same year), and became a variety station owned by Vic Michael of Kona Coast which officially signed on in 2007.

In October 2005, the call sign changed from KKHI to KHAI. In March 2007, Kona Coast sold KHAI to the Educational Media Foundation, which began running its Air1 service, which eventually was switched over to K-love. (Note: There is a lack of reliable resources here, so take this info with a grain of salt.) KHAI obtained the present KLUU callsign from K-love's Jamestown, North Dakota affiliate KJKL in 2015.

== Subchannels ==
KLUU broadcasts using HD Radio technology.

- On its HD2 digital subchannel, it carries Air 1, a sister station to K-love, relayed on an FM translator on 105.5 MHz.
- On the HD3 subchannel, KLUU runs K-Love Classics, a Christian music network that covers the 1980s through the early 2000s.

== Translators ==
KLUU programming is also carried on a broadcast translator station to extend or improve the coverage area of the station.

Broadcast translator for KLUU
Call sign	Frequency	City of license	FID	ERP (W)	Class	FCC info
K288FB	105.5 FM FM	Honolulu, Hawaii	150317	250	D	LMS
