= KWYI =

- Kawaihae, Hawaii; United States
- Broadcast area: Kailua-Kona, Hawaii
- Frequency: 106.9 MHz
- Branding: The Beach Radio 106.9 Kona 102.7 Hilo

Programming
- Format: Hot AC/Oldies

Ownership
- Owner: Resonate Broadcasting; (Resonate Hawaii, LLC)
- Sister stations: KTBH-FM, KHBC, KHWI

History
- First air date: November 1993
- Former call signs: KTDH (5/3/1990-6/4/1990)
- Call sign meaning: sounds like "Kawaihae"

Technical information
- Licensing authority: FCC
- Facility ID: 12244
- Class: C1
- ERP: 4,500 watts
- HAAT: 904 meters (341 feet)
- Transmitter coordinates: 19°53′09″N 155°39′28″W
- Repeater: 102.7 KTBH-FM (Hilo)

Links
- Public license information: Public file; LMS
- Webcast: Listen Live
- Website: The Beach

KWYI (106.9 FM, "The Beach Radio 106.9 Kona 102.7 Hilo") is a radio station licensed to serve Kawaihae, Hawaii. The station is owned by Resonate Hawaii LLC. It airs a Hot Adult Contemporary format featuring Oldies music on the weekends.

The station was assigned the KWYI call letters by the Federal Communications Commission on June 4, 1990.

KWYI is now "The Beach Radio 106.9 Kona 102.7 Hilo".
