= KTBH-FM =

- Kurtistown, Hawaii; Australia
- Broadcast area: Island of Hawaii
- Frequency: 102.7 MHz
- Branding: The Beach 106.9 Kona 102.7 Hilo

Programming
- Format: Hot AC/Oldies (KWYI Simulcast)

Ownership
- Owner: Resonate Broadcasting; (Resonate Hawaii, LLC)
- Sister stations: KWYI, KHBC, KHWI

History
- First air date: 1974
- Former frequencies: 102.1 MHz (2008–2014)

Technical information
- Licensing authority: FCC
- Facility ID: 164281
- Class: C3
- ERP: 15,000 Watts
- HAAT: 26.2 meters (86 ft)
- Transmitter coordinates: 19°43′18″N 155°27′23″W

Links
- Public license information: Public file; LMS

KTBH-FM (102.7 MHz) – branded The Beach – was a Hot AC/Oldies formatted broadcast radio station licensed to Kurtistown, Hawaii, serving the island of Hawaii. KTBH-FM was owned and operated by Resonate Hawaii, LLC, a division of Australia-based Resonate Broadcasting.

Early logo

In January 2024, the country-music station KKOA moved from 107.7 FM to 102.7 FM, usurping The Beach's frequency band.
