= Kumu Hula =

A Kumu Hula is a master teacher in the art of Hula. They usually run and participate in dance schools called hālau hula.

== Certification ==
A master teacher instructs those studying to become formally graduated kumu hula, passing on knowledge received within their own hula lineage. In addition to dance technique and choreography, training includes study of esoteric knowledge of costuming, plants, and protocol related to the hula altar, which is dedicated to Laka, the patron goddess of hula. When the teacher is satisfied that the knowledge will be responsibly used and carefully protected by the student, then an ‘ūniki ceremony is scheduled.

== See also ==
- Hālau hula
- Hula
- Laka
