= KLHI-FM =

Hawaiian contemporary hit radio station in Kahului, Hawaii

- Kahului, Hawaii; United States
- Broadcast area: Maui
- Frequency: 92.5 MHz
- Branding: HI92

Programming
- Language: English
- Format: Hawaiian contemporary hit radio

Ownership
- Owner: Pacific Radio Group, Inc.
- Sister stations: KJKS; KJMD; KMVI; KNUI; KPOA

History
- First air date: September 12, 2006
- Former call signs: KORL-FM (2006–2007)

Technical information
- Licensing authority: FCC
- Facility ID: 166083
- Class: C2
- ERP: 1,700 watts
- HAAT: 674 meters (2,211 ft)
- Transmitter coordinates: 20°39′36″N 156°21′50″W
- Translator: 101.7 K269FL (Kahului)

Links
- Public license information: Public file; LMS
- Webcast: Listen live
- Website: hi92maui.com

KLHI-FM (92.5 FM) is a radio station licensed to Kahului, Hawaii, United States, and serving the Maui area. The station is currently owned by Pacific Radio Group.

== History ==
The station went on the air as KORL-FM on September 12, 2006. On June 29, 2007, the station changed its call sign to the current KLHI-FM. On April 30, 2009, the format switched from alternative rock to island and reggae, to include native Hawaiian music, and now goes by the name "Native 92.5".

On April 20, 2018, KLHI rebranded as HI92, "Today's Island Hits"; the new format maintains similar content, but with an emphasis towards newer music, as well as reggae.
