= KNUQ =

- Paauilo, Hawaii; United States
- Broadcast area: Maui, Hawaii
- Frequency: 103.9 MHz
- Branding: "Q103"

Programming
- Format: Hot adult contemporary
- Subchannels: HD2: Rhythmic adult contemporary "98.7 The Vibe"; HD3: Reggae "103.3 The Beat"; HD4: KAOI simulcast
- Affiliations: Premiere Networks; United Stations Radio Networks

Ownership
- Owner: Akamai Broadcasting
- Sister stations: KAOI, KEWE, KHEI-FM, KIXK, KSRR

History
- First air date: 1983 (as KHCR at 103.7)
- Former call signs: KHCR (1983-199); KILU (1991-1994)
- Former frequencies: 103.7 MHz (1983–2013)

Technical information
- Licensing authority: FCC
- Facility ID: 15969
- Class: C
- ERP: 14,500 watts
- HAAT: 1,758 meters
- Transmitter coordinates: 20°38′18″N 156°23′01″W

Links
- Public license information: Public file; LMS
- Website: www.akamaidailynews.com/q103 HD2: www.akamaidailynews.com/987thevibe HD3: www.akamaidailynews.com/1033thebeat

KNUQ (103.9 FM, "Q103") is a radio station licensed to serve Paauilo, Hawaii. Owned by Akamai Broadcasting, it broadcasts a hot adult contemporary format.

The station was assigned the KNUQ call letters by the Federal Communications Commission on September 22, 1994.

In 2024, Visionary Related Entertainment sold all of its Maui stations to Akamai Broadcasting. On December 9, 2024, KNUQ flipped to hot adult contemporary, and moved its existing Hawaiian rhythmic format to its two translator stations on 103.3 as "103.3 The Beat".

== Translators and booster ==
Call sign	Frequency	City of license	FID	ERP (W)	Class	FCC info	Notes
K254CS	98.7 FM	Kihei, Hawaii	148061	250	D	LMS	Relays KNUQ-HD2
K277AW	103.3 FM	Napili, Hawaii	148202	125	D	LMS	Relays KNUQ
K277AX	103.3 FM	Paia, Hawaii	148150	20	D	LMS	Relays KNUQ-HD3
KNUQ-FM1	103.9 FM	Kahului, Hawaii	15966	95	D	LMS	Relays KNUQ
