= KZOO =

- Honolulu, Hawaii; United States
- Broadcast area: Honolulu metropolitan area
- Frequency: 1210 (kHz)
- Branding: Radio KZOO

Programming
- Language: Japanese
- Format: J-Pop/Japanese Variety

Ownership
- Owner: Polynesian Broadcasting, Inc.

History
- First air date: October 18, 1963

Technical information
- Licensing authority: FCC
- Class: B
- Power: 1,000 watts
- Transmitter coordinates: 21°17′29.7″N 157°51′39″W
- Translator: 106.3 K292HM (Honolulu)

Links
- Public license information: Public file; LMS
- Webcast: Listen Live
- Website: www.kzoohawaii.com

KZOO or Kay-Zoo (1210 AM) is a radio station catering to the Japanese community of Honolulu, Hawaii. The station plays news, talk shows, and J-Pop. It is owned by Polynesian Broadcasting, Inc. KZOO also retransmits on Oceanic Spectrum digital channel 888 for the entire state of Hawaii.

KZOO has been broadcasting continuously in Japanese since the station signed on October 18, 1963. It was not the first Japanese-language station in Honolulu (competitor KOHO/1170 signed on in 1959), but it is the only one still on the air today.

== History ==
The station has been owned by Polynesian Broadcasting since 1967, when businessman Noboru Furuya took over KZOO's operations. Furuya's son David and his wife Robyn took over management of the station in the mid-1990s when Furuya's health began to decline. Noboru Furuya died in 2002 at the age of 82; David and Robyn Furuya (now the president and vice-president, respectively, of Polynesian Broadcasting) continue to run KZOO today.

Though most of their programs are broadcast from their offices at the Japanese Cultural Center of Hawaii, in 2011 KZOO began broadcasting special interviews from a studio in the Shirokiya in Ala Moana Shopping Center.

== Programming ==
KZOO's programs include news, talk shows, and Japanese music. Most of it is original programming, but some of the talk shows are from Japan.

Many of KZOO's current on-air staff have been with the station for decades, including Keiko Ura, host of an Okinawan language show on Sundays, who joined the station in early 1964; Maki Norris, one of the hosts of a popular daily talk show called "Moshi-Moshi Time," who has worked at KZOO since 1976; and Harumi "Danny" Oshita.

KZOO has a history of sponsoring Japanese speech (Nihongo Hanashikata Taikai, started by announcer Keiko Ura in 1965) and nodojiman and karaoke song contests in Honolulu, with winners going on to represent Hawaii at contests in Japan. The station's broadcast day also includes simulcasts of programs from Japan as well as local talk and advice shows on a variety of topics, from health to the law.

== Disaster relief ==
When KZOO was knocked off the air by the 2006 Kiholo Bay earthquake, the station's assistant general manager, Kaoru Ekimoto, contacted English-language adult contemporary music station KSSK, who put her on the air with disaster relief information in Japanese; the station also set up a hotline to answer listener questions. The station later added a backup generator for its transmitter.
