= KWXX-FM =

Radio station in Hilo, Hawaii

KWXX-FM and KAOY

KWXX-FM: Hilo, Hawaii; KAOY: Kealakekua, Hawaii; United States
- Broadcast area: Hilo/Kailua-Kona
- Frequencies: KWXX-FM: 94.7 MHz; KAOY: 101.5 MHz
- Branding: KWXX

Programming
- Format: Adult contemporary

Ownership
- Owner: New West Broadcasting Corp.
- Sister stations: KMWB, KNWB, KPUA

History
- First air date: KWXX-FM: December 16, 1983; KAOY: May 18, 1981
- Former call signs: KAOY: KKON-FM (1981–1982); KOAS (1982–1992)

Technical information
- Licensing authority: FCC
- Facility ID: KWXX-FM: 48679; KAOY: 70377
- Class: KWXX-FM: C1; KAOY: C0
- ERP: KWXX-FM: 51,000 watts; KAOY: 6,500 watts
- HAAT: KWXX-FM: −231 meters (−758 ft); KAOY: 909 meters (2,982 ft)
- Transmitter coordinates: KWXX-FM: 19°47′2″N 155°5′25″W; KAOY: 19°43′15″N 155°55′16″W

Links
- Public license information: KWXX-FM: Public file; LMS; KAOY: Public file; LMS
- Webcast: Listen live
- Website: kwxx.com

KWXX-FM (94.7 FM) is a radio station in Hilo, Hawaii broadcasting an adult contemporary format as well as local music. A satellite station, KAOY (101.5 FM), is licensed to Kealakekua, Hawaii and serves the Kailua-Kona area. The station is owned by New West Broadcasting Corp.

== History ==
KAOY went on the air as KKON-FM on May 18, 1981. In 1982, the station changed its call sign to KOAS. On February 7, 1992, the current call letters were adapted.

KWXX went on the air on December 16, 1983.
