= KMWB =

Radio station in Captain Cook, Hawaii

- Captain Cook, Hawaii; United States
- Broadcast area: Hilo, Hawaii
- Frequency: 93.1 MHz
- Branding: B93

Programming
- Format: Classic hits

Ownership
- Owner: New West Broadcasting Corp.; (New West Broadcasting Corp.)
- Sister stations: KAOY, KNWB, KPUA, KWXX

History
- First air date: 1998

Technical information
- Licensing authority: FCC
- Facility ID: 164099
- Class: C0
- ERP: 10,000 watts
- HAAT: 986 meters (3,235 ft)
- Transmitter coordinates: 19°43′15″N 155°55′16″W

Links
- Public license information: Public file; LMS
- Webcast: Listen Live
- Website: KMWB Online

KMWB (93.1 FM, "B93") is a radio station licensed to serve Captain Cook, Hawaii, United States. The station is owned by the New West Broadcasting Corporation.

KMWB broadcasts a classic hits music format in conjunction with sister station KNWB (97.1 FM, "B97"). KMWB covers West Hawaii and KNWB serves East Hawaii.

The station was assigned the KMWB call sign by the Federal Communications Commission on October 4, 2007.
