= KPHI =

- Honolulu, Hawaii; United States
- Frequency: 1130 kHz
- Branding: Shaka 96.7

Programming
- Format: Hawaiian oldies

Ownership
- Owner: H. Hawaii Media
- Sister stations: KHXM, KORL-FM, KITH, KJMQ, KONI, KRKH, KRYL, KTOH, KQMY (FM)

History
- First air date: September 23, 2008
- Call sign meaning: Philippines; station originally had an original Pilipino music format

Technical information
- Licensing authority: FCC
- Facility ID: 88995
- Class: B
- Power: 1,000 watts
- Transmitter coordinates: 21°26′6.7″N 157°59′19″W
- Translator: 96.7 K244EO (Honolulu)

Links
- Public license information: Public file; LMS
- Webcast: Listen Live

KPHI (1130 AM, "Shaka 96.7") is a radio station located in Honolulu, Hawaii. The station is owned by H. Hawaii Media and airs a Hawaiian oldies format. The studios are located in Downtown Honolulu and the transmitter is located near Mililani. KPHI is rebroadcast on FM translator K244EO (96.7 FM) in Honolulu and on Spectrum (formerly Oceanic Time Warner Cable) digital channel 882 throughout the state of Hawaii.

== History ==
Logo for KPHI as an OPM station until 2019

KPHI first signed on September 23, 2008, with an original Pilipino music (OPM) format. The station, which originally was supposed to have the call letters KRUD, replaced the multicultural KORL, which signed off that same day in part due to the former having a more powerful signal.

In early 2019, KPHI flipped to a Hawaiian music format as "Shaka 96.7".
