= KMVI =

- Kahului, Hawaii; United States
- Broadcast area: Maui
- Frequency: 900 kHz
- Branding: ESPN Maui 900 AM

Programming
- Format: Sports
- Affiliations: ESPN Radio

Ownership
- Owner: Pacific Radio Group, Inc.
- Sister stations: KJKS, KJMD, KLHI-FM, KNUI, KPOA

History
- First air date: 1963 (as KNUI)
- Former call signs: KNUI (1963–2013)

Technical information
- Licensing authority: FCC
- Facility ID: 9678
- Class: B
- Power: 5,000 watts
- Transmitter coordinates: 20°47′18.7″N 156°27′51.1″W
- Translator: 102.5 K273DN (Kahului)

Links
- Public license information: Public file; LMS
- Webcast: Listen Live
- Website: espnmaui.com

KMVI (900 AM) is a radio station broadcasting a sports radio format. The station is licensed to Kahului, Hawaii, United States. The station is currently owned by Pacific Radio Group, Inc., and features programming from ESPN Radio. It was originally on 1310 kHz and moved to 900 kHz in 1982.

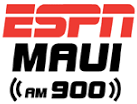
Logo before translator sign on
