= KPUA =

Radio station in Hilo, Hawaii

- Hilo, Hawaii; United States
- Frequency: 670 kHz
- Branding: KPUA AM 670

Programming
- Format: News/Talk/Sports
- Affiliations: Wall Street Journal Radio Network; Westwood One; Premiere Networks; CBS News Radio

Ownership
- Owner: New West Broadcasting Corp.
- Sister stations: KAOY, KMWB, KNWB, KWXX

History
- First air date: May 1, 1936 (as KHBC at 1400)
- Former call signs: KHBC (1936–1965)
- Former frequencies: 1400 kHz (1936–1940); 1200 kHz (1940–1941); 1230 kHz (1941–1949); 970 kHz (1949–1985)

Technical information
- Licensing authority: FCC
- Facility ID: 48678
- Class: B
- Power: 5,000 watts
- Transmitter coordinates: 19°46′50.8″N 155°05′15.2″W
- Translator: (98.5 MHz) K253CR (Hilo)

Links
- Public license information: Public file; LMS
- Website: www.kpua.net

KPUA (670 AM) is an American radio station licensed to serve the community of Hilo, Hawaii. The station, established in 1936 as "KHBC", has been owned and operated by New West Broadcasting Corporation since 1992. KPUA broadcasts a variety of local and syndicated talk radio programming, including some specialty Japanese language programs.

== Programming ==
KPUA broadcasts a news/talk/sports radio format to the Hilo area. As of March 6, 2012, syndicated programming on the station includes Wall Street Journal This Morning hosted by Gordon Deal and Gina Cervetti (Wall Street Journal Radio Network), First Light hosted by Dirk Van (Dial Global), Coast to Coast AM hosted by George Noory (Premiere Networks), and America in the Morning with Jim Bohannon (Dial Global), plus programming blocks from Yahoo! Sports Radio and CBS Radio News. Local weekday programming includes Japanese Show with Taka.

== History ==
=== KHBC era ===
On May 1, 1936, Honolulu Broadcasting Company, Ltd., established a new radio station to serve Hilo, Hawaii, with 250 watts of power on a medium wave frequency of 1400 kilohertz (kHz). This station was assigned the call sign "KHBC" (for Honolulu Broadcasting Company) by the U.S. Federal Communications Commission (FCC).

By 1940, the station had been acquired by the Hawaiian Broadcasting System, Ltd., and shifted to 1200 kHz while maintaining the 250 watt signal. KHBC was one of several broadcast stations owned by the Honolulu Star-Bulletin as part of the Hawaiian Broadcasting System stations group. On March 29, 1941, the signal was relocated to 1230 kHz, still at 250 watts, as part of a mass realignment of radio stations due to the North American Regional Broadcasting Agreement. During this time, the station was an affiliate of the CBS Radio Network.

In 1948, KHBC was granted a new construction permit to shift to 970 kHz and to increase its power output to 1,000 watts. The station began licensed operation at the new parameters in 1949.

=== KPUA era ===
In 1965, the Honolulu Star-Bulletin reached a deal to sell most of its stations to the A.L. Glassmann stations group but sold KHBC separately to the Pacific Broadcasting Corporation, owned by Cecil "Cec" Heftel. The deal was consummated on June 7, 1965. The new owners had the FCC assign the "KPUA" call sign to the station in late 1965. The station was an affiliate of the CBS Radio Network. In 1969, the station received FCC authorization to increase broadcast power from 1,000 to 5,000 watts.

=== 1970s ===
By the mid-1970s, the station's format was middle of the road music and KPUA was an affiliate of both the ABC Radio Network and the Coconut Wireless Network. In 1975 as Cecil Heftel was planning his (ultimately successful) campaign for the United States House of Representatives from Hawaii's 1st congressional district, Pacific Broadcasting agreed to sell KPUA to the Aloha Broadcasting Company. The deal gained FCC approval and formal consummation of the transaction took place on January 1, 1976. The station maintained the MOR format and network affiliation under the new ownership.

In January 1979, Aloha Broadcasting contracted to sell KPUA to Hawaii Broadcasting Company, Inc. The deal gained FCC approval on May 1, 1979, and the transaction was consummated on May 3, 1979.

=== 1980s ===
In August 1981, KPUA's new owners applied to the FCC for a new construction permit to allow the station to change frequencies from 970 to 670 kHz, change its transmitter site, and increase power to 10,000 watts. The FCC granted this permit on July 8, 1983, with a scheduled expiration date on July 8, 1984. After several amendments and renewals, construction and testing were completed in August 1985. KPUA began licensed broadcasting on the 670 kHz frequency on December 20, 1985.

In May 1989, Hawaii Broadcasting Company reached a deal to transfer the KPUA broadcast license to Hawaii Radio, Inc. The FCC approved the move on July 12, 1989, and the transaction was consummated on August 22, 1989.

=== 1990s ===
Following a November 1989 application, the FCC granted KPUA's new owners a construction permit to increase the station's power to 50,000 watts, day and night, and make related changes to their antenna system. The permit was issued on December 31, 1990, with a scheduled expiration date on June 30, 1992.

However, before the construction could be completed, Hawaii Radio, Inc., encountered financial difficulties and in March 1992, the station's assets and broadcast license were involuntarily assigned to Wyman Lai, acting as bankruptcy trustee. By the end of March, trustee Lai had arranged to sell KPUA to New West Broadcasting Corporation. The FCC approved the sale on May 18, 1992, and formal consummation of the deal occurred on July 16, 1992.

=== 2000s ===
In January 2003, the station launched its KPUA.net website as a news portal, mixing local stories by its news staff with regional, national, and international news from the Associated Press.

In 2004, the station requested and received special temporary authority to operate at a reduced power of just 5,000 watts, citing engineering issues with the station's transmitter. These requests were repeated in 2007 and 2008. In September 2008, KPUA requested a new construction permit to allow permanent operation at this 5,000 watt level. The FCC granted this permit on February 18, 2009, with a scheduled expiration of February 18, 2012. KPUA received a new license to cover this change on January 19, 2010.

=== 2010s ===
Former logo

On March 5, 2012, KPUA made international headlines when it canceled The Rush Limbaugh Show after Limbaugh came under fire for calling law student Sandra Fluke a "slut" and a "prostitute." KPUA is believed to be the first of only two affiliates to cancel the show over the controversy (the other being WBEC in Massachusetts; for perspective, Limbaugh has approximately 600 affiliates across the United States). Station manager Chris Leonard told the Honolulu Star-Advertiser that "decency and responsibility" demanded that his station sever its ties with Limbaugh.

== Former staff ==
Shinobu Sato hosted a one-hour weekday morning Japanese language program called Echoes of Japan. Her long career at KHBC/KPUA led the station's general manager, asked when Sato started hosting, to tell the Honolulu Star-Bulletin in December 2001, "We've never been able to figure it out exactly. It's close to 50 years." Sato retired from KPUA in May 2002 after 43 years on the air. The Japanese Community Association of Hawaii named Sato a "cultural treasure" in 2003 for her "significant contributions to the preservation and perpetuating of the Japanese culture and arts", In addition to her extended radio career, Sato had worked as a state papaya inspector and cosmetics sales agent. Born in Papa'ikou, Hawai'i, she died on October 17, 2008, at the age of 98.
