= KRKH =

- Wailea-Makena, Hawaii; United States
- Broadcast area: Maui County, Hawaii
- Frequency: 97.3 MHz
- Branding: K-Rock 97.3

Programming
- Format: Classic rock

Ownership
- Owner: HHawaii Media; (Hochman Hawaii Publishing, Inc.)
- Sister stations: KITH, KONI (FM), KORL, KORL-FM, KPHI, KJMQ, KRYL, KTOH, KQMY (FM)

History
- First air date: June 4, 2008; 17 years ago
- Call sign meaning: K Rock Hawaii

Technical information
- Licensing authority: FCC
- Facility ID: 170964
- Class: C2
- ERP: 320 watts
- HAAT: 696 meters (2,283 ft)
- Transmitter coordinates: 20°39′36″N 156°21′50″W

Links
- Public license information: Public file; LMS
- Webcast: Listen live
- Website: www.hhawaiimedia.com/maui

KRKH (97.3 FM) is a classic rock formatted broadcast radio station licensed to Wailea-Makena, Hawaii, serving Maui County, Hawaii. KRKH is owned and operated by HHawaii Media.
