= KHNU =

Radio station in Hilo, Hawaii (1947–2015)

- Hilo, Hawaii; United States
- Broadcast area: Hilo
- Frequency: 620 kHz

Ownership
- Owner: Matthew Clapp, Jr.; (Mahalo Multimedia, LLC)
- Sister stations: KBGX, KKOA

History
- First air date: September 3, 1947
- Last air date: 2014
- Former call signs: KIPA (1947–2008)
- Former frequencies: 1110 kHz (1961–1974)
- Call sign meaning: Honu (branding)

Technical information
- Facility ID: 5253
- Class: B
- Power: 5,000 watts; 10,000 watts (experimental synchronous operation in Kalaoa); 5,000 watts (experimental synchronous operation in Naalehu)
- Transmitter coordinates: 19°51′2″N 155°5′7″W; 19°44′12″N 156°1′56″W (experimental synchronous operation in Kalaoa); 19°0′18″N 155°40′37″W (experimental synchronous operation in Naalehu)

KHNU (620 AM) was a radio station licensed to Hilo, Hawaii, United States, and served the Hilo area. Last owned by Matthew Clapp, Jr., through licensee Mahalo Multimedia, LLC., it carried a talk radio format as "Honu 62" at the time of closure. It was additionally licensed to operate experimental synchronous operations at Kalaoa and Naalehu.

== History ==
This station began their broadcasts as KIPA on September 3, 1947, through various formats. It moved from 1110 AM to 620 AM in May 1974. The most recent format was oldies/adult standards music that has featured programming from ABC Radio's "Timeless Favorites" satellite feed. In 2007, its previous owner Skynet had to sign KIPA off the air after the station lost its transmitter lease. New owners brought the station back on the air with a new callsign and new format that featured programming from Sean Hannity, Dr. Laura Schlessinger, Michael Savage, and Handel on the Law, among other hosts.

On December 4, 2015, the Federal Communications Commission notified KHNU's licensee that the station's license had expired effective November 22, 2015, due to the station having been silent for the previous year.
