= KORL-FM =

Radio station in Waianae–Honolulu, Hawaii

- Waianae, Hawaii; United States
- Broadcast area: Honolulu metropolitan area
- Frequency: 101.1 MHz (HD Radio)
- Branding: KORL 101.1: Classic Hits

Programming
- Format: Classic hits
- Subchannels: HD2: 101.5 K-Rock (Classic rock); HD3: "Jazzy 107.5" (Smooth jazz); HD4: Retro 97.1 (1990s' and 2000s' hits)

Ownership
- Owner: Hochman Hawaii-Three, Inc.
- Sister stations: KITH, KJMQ, KONI, KHXM, KPHI, KRKH, KRYL, KTOH, KQMY

History
- First air date: 1989 (as KLHI in Maui County, Hawaii; Relocated to Waianae, Hawaii in 2006)
- Former call signs: Maui County: KLHI (1989–2006)
- Call sign meaning: Phonetically similar to "coral"

Technical information
- Licensing authority: FCC
- Facility ID: 36242
- Class: C
- ERP: 100,000 watts horizontal 81,000 watts vertical
- HAAT: 592 meters (1,942 ft)
- Transmitter coordinates: 21°23′34.6″N 158°5′48.2″W
- Translators: HD2: 101.5 K268BE (Honolulu); HD3: 107.5 K298BA (Honolulu); HD4: 97.1 K246BR (Honolulu)

Links
- Public license information: Public file; LMS
- Webcast: Listen Live; Listen Live (HD2); Listen Live (HD3); Listen Live (HD4)
- Website: KORL Online

KORL-FM (101.1 MHz) is a commercial radio station licensed to Waianae, Hawaii, and serving the Honolulu metropolitan area. The station broadcasts a classic rock radio format, concentrating on classic hits of the late 1960s through the early 1990s. It is owned by Hochman Hawaii-Three, Inc.. It also transmits on Oceanic Spectrum digital channel 883 for the entire state of Hawaii. Its radio studios are located in Downtown Honolulu.

KORL-FM's transmitter is off Palehua Road in Kapolei, Hawaii. It broadcasts using HD Radio technology. KORL-FM has three digital subchannels feeding three FM translators with different programming: classic rock on HD2 and 101.5 MHz, smooth jazz on HD3 and 107.5 MHz, 1990s' and 2000s' hits on HD4 and 97.1 MHz.

== History ==
The station signed on in 1989 adopting an adult classic rock music format with the call letters KLHI. By 1996, the format changed to a modern adult contemporary music, later evolving to a modern rock sound.

In 2005 The Federal Communications Commission (FCC) gave the station the green light to move the transmitter and its city of license to Honolulu. After the change was made, KLHI adopted the new call sign KORL-FM and dropped the modern rock music format, moving it to a new frequency of 92.5 FM and serving the Maui area.

At first after KORL-FM's move-in in 2006, the station originally played multi-cultural programming during the day and smooth jazz at night and 24 hours on the weekends. But on June 9, 2008, KORL-FM dropped all of its daytime multi-cultural programming and went with smooth jazz full-time.

On December 12, 2011, KORL-FM became the first station in the United States to have 4 HD subchannels. One duplicated the analog signal and the other three fed three different analog translators. The main channel flipped formats to adult top 40 and moved the smooth jazz format to its HD2 subchannel and FM translator K268BE at 101.5 FM. The HD3 channel was launched with a Korean Contemporary - K-Pop format, rebroadcasting on FM translator K298BA at 107.5 FM. And the HD4 channel debuted with a Japanese Contemporary - J-Pop format, rebroadcasting on FM translator K246BR at 97.1 FM (switched from K244EF 96.7 FM.

Programming on 101.5/101.1 HD2 soon switched from Broadcast Architecture's Smooth Jazz Network (which was also heard on the chief signal when it was a smooth jazz outlet) to a locally programmed smooth AC mix dubbed "Smooth FM Hawaiian Style". In the spring of 2013, the smooth AC format of 101.1 HD2 and 101.5 changed to active rock, branded as "K-Rock, Honolulu's Real Rock." 101.5 is an affiliate of the syndicated Pink Floyd program "Floydian Slip."

On July 2, 2015, the J-pop format on 101.1 HD4 changed to classic hip hop, branded as "Boom 97.1". However, shortly after, 97.1 had to drop the Boom branding, as Radio One has the exclusive rights to use it with its classic hip hop stations. After briefly branding as "97dot1", the station later rebranded as "Hot 97dot1". In August 2016, KORL-HD4 flipped to all-1980s' hits as "Retro 97.1.". On January 1, 2017, KORL-HD3 flipped to country music as "Nash Icon 107.5". In March 2021, KORL-HD3 reverted to smooth jazz as "Jazzy 107.5.".

On April 11, 2024, KORL-FM silently abandoned its oldies format and flipped to a classic hits format, primarily focusing on music released in the 1970s and 1980s. It rebranded as "KORL 101.1", incorporating the station's call sign. In conjunction with this change, H Hawaii Media also flipped KORL-HD4 from an all-1980s' format to 1990s' to 2000s' hits, still retaining the "Retro 97.1" branding. A similar change occurred on its Maui sister stations, KQMY and KONI.

== KXRG-LP ==
Prior to KORL-FM's move-in, another radio station broadcast on the same frequency, called "Energy 101.1" (KXRG-LP). It aired nonstop dance music at around 2pm to 2am from Ala Moana to Pearlridge. Energy 101.1's frequency could not be heard from the windward areas such as Kaneohe and Kailua.

KXRG later signed off so KORL-FM could occupy the frequency. KXRG looked to move to another frequency. Due to its status as a low-power station and was off the air from 2007 to 2010, when it returned on a new signal, this time at 95.9.

== Previous logos ==
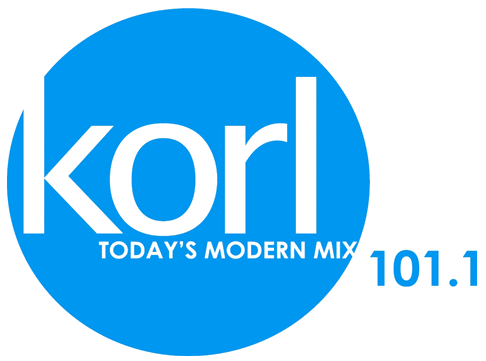
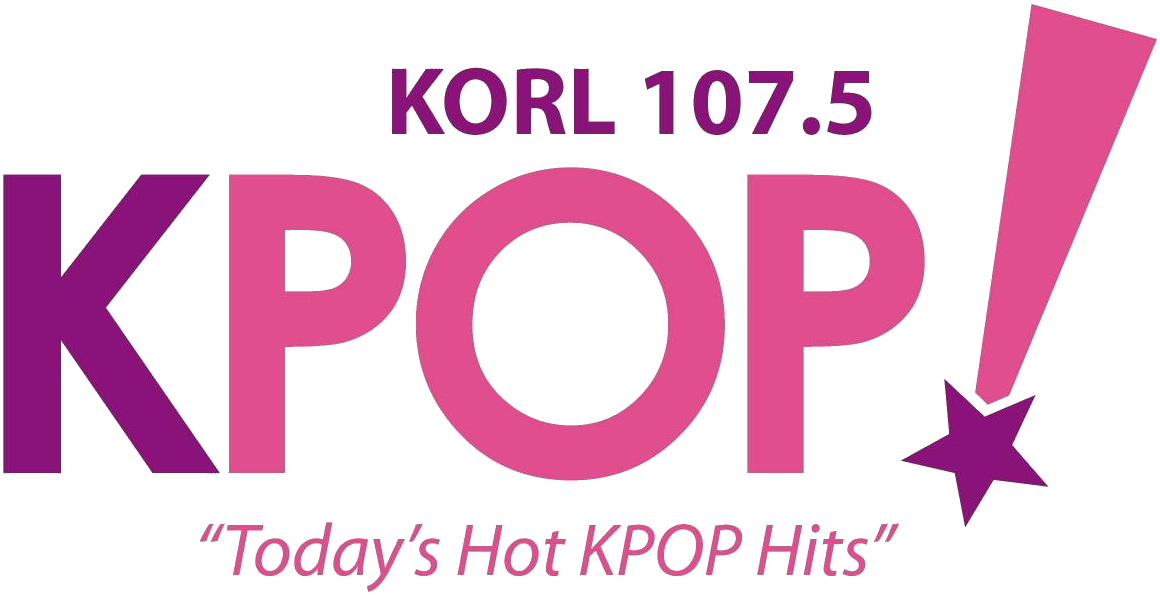
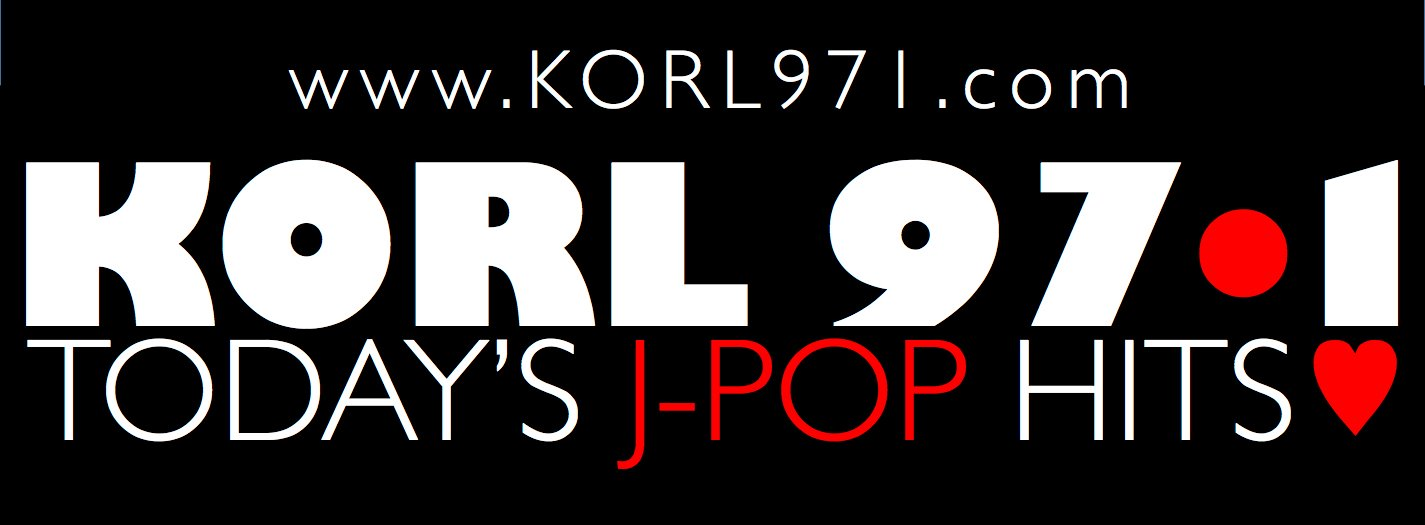
