= Hawaii Public Radio =

Public radio network in Hawaii, United States

Hawaiʻi Public Radio
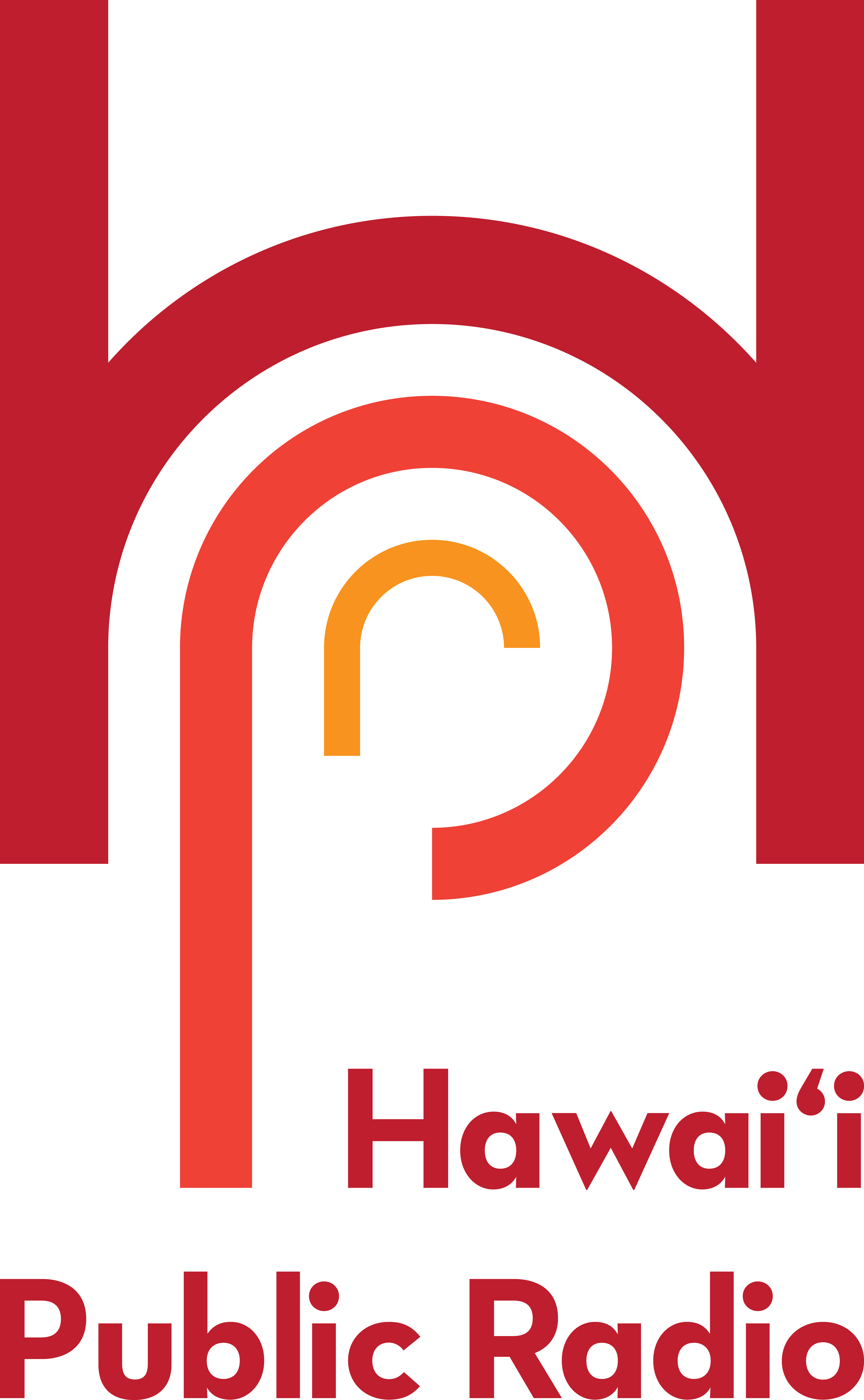
- Type: Public radio
- Country: United States
- First air date: November 14, 1981
- Broadcast area: Hawaii
- Owner: Hawaiʻi Public Radio, Inc.
- Affiliations: NPR; PRX; APM
- Official website: hawaiipublicradio.org

Hawaiʻi Public Radio (HPR), is a network of listener-supported, public radio stations broadcasting two streams on fifteen frequencies across the state of Hawaii. It is a member of National Public Radio (NPR). The stations originate from studios at Suite 101 The Hawaii Public Radio Plaza on Kaheka Street, near the Ala Moana Shopping Center in Honolulu. HPR-1 focuses on news and information by day, with jazz and other music in the evening and the BBC World Service overnight. HPR-2 is mostly classical music, with some hours supplied by Classical 24.

== History ==
The network's original station, KHPR 88.1 FM, signed on the air in Honolulu on November 14, 1981. It mostly played classical music with NPR news shows, originally operating with a staff of two, General Manager Cliff Eblen and Music Director Bob Miller. Operating from rented space at the University of Hawaii, it moved to its current studios in July 1987. A year later, HPR became a true statewide network with the sign-on of a station in Maui, reaching listeners on Maui and Hawaii Island.

HPR's programming choices increased in October 1989, with a second program stream on KIPO 89.3 FM. KIPO began broadcasting jazz and folk music. In August 2000, expansion continued with the addition of KANO 91.1 (Hilo), broadcasting KHPR's classical music and news program stream to East Hawaiʻi Island. In 2010, two new boosters were installed on Mt. Kaʻala on Oʻahu's North Shore, beaming both KHPR 88.1 and KIPO 89.3 at the terrain-shielded North Shore, as well as at the south and east shores of Kauaʻi (June). The following year, expansion of the KIPO signal to Maui was implemented and KIPM 89.7 went on the air in the spring. KIPH 88.3, serving Hāna, Maui, began service shortly after.

With these infrastructure additions, statewide coverage of two streams became possible, and in the spring of 2012, the two HPR program streams were rebranded as HPR-1 and HPR-2.

On February 13, 2013, KHPH 88.7 (Kailua-Kona) brought HPR programs to the many terrain-shielded pockets along West Hawaiʻi, including Waimea. That same year, KIPL 89.9 (Līhuʻe) went on the air, making available HPR-2ʻs news, talk, and international music available to the majority the remaining areas of Kauaʻi island.

== Programming ==
HPR-1 offers news and talk by day, a variety of music programming in the evening and BBC World Service overnight. The daytime schedule includes NPR's weekday shows: Morning Edition, All Things Considered, Here and Now, On Point and Fresh Air. Also on the schedule is HPR's own weekday news and current affairs program The Conversation. Weeknights feature Evening Jazz and Bridging the Gap, an eclectic music program; both music shows produced in-house. Saturday programming includes This American Life, Wait Wait... Don't Tell Me!, The Moth Radio Hour and Radiolab, as well as locally produced Brazilian Experience, showcasing Brazilian music. Sundays feature a mix of spirituality programming (On Being and New Dimensions), ideas (TED Radio Hour) as well as music shows include Kanakapila Sunday, showcasing Hawaiian music, and American Routes. Overnight, the BBC World Service is carried.

HPR-2 ("Your Home for Classical Music") is Hawaii's only dedicated classical music station, offering a mix of national and locally produced shows. Local shows include Morning Cafe/Morning Concert, Classical Pacific, Howard's Day Off, and The Early Muse. The station also broadcasts symphony performances from Pittsburgh, Chicago, San Francisco, and others. Select performances of the Hawaii Symphony Orchestra and the Hawaii Youth Symphony are also broadcast. Late nights and some hours on weekends, Classical 24 programming is heard.

== Stations ==
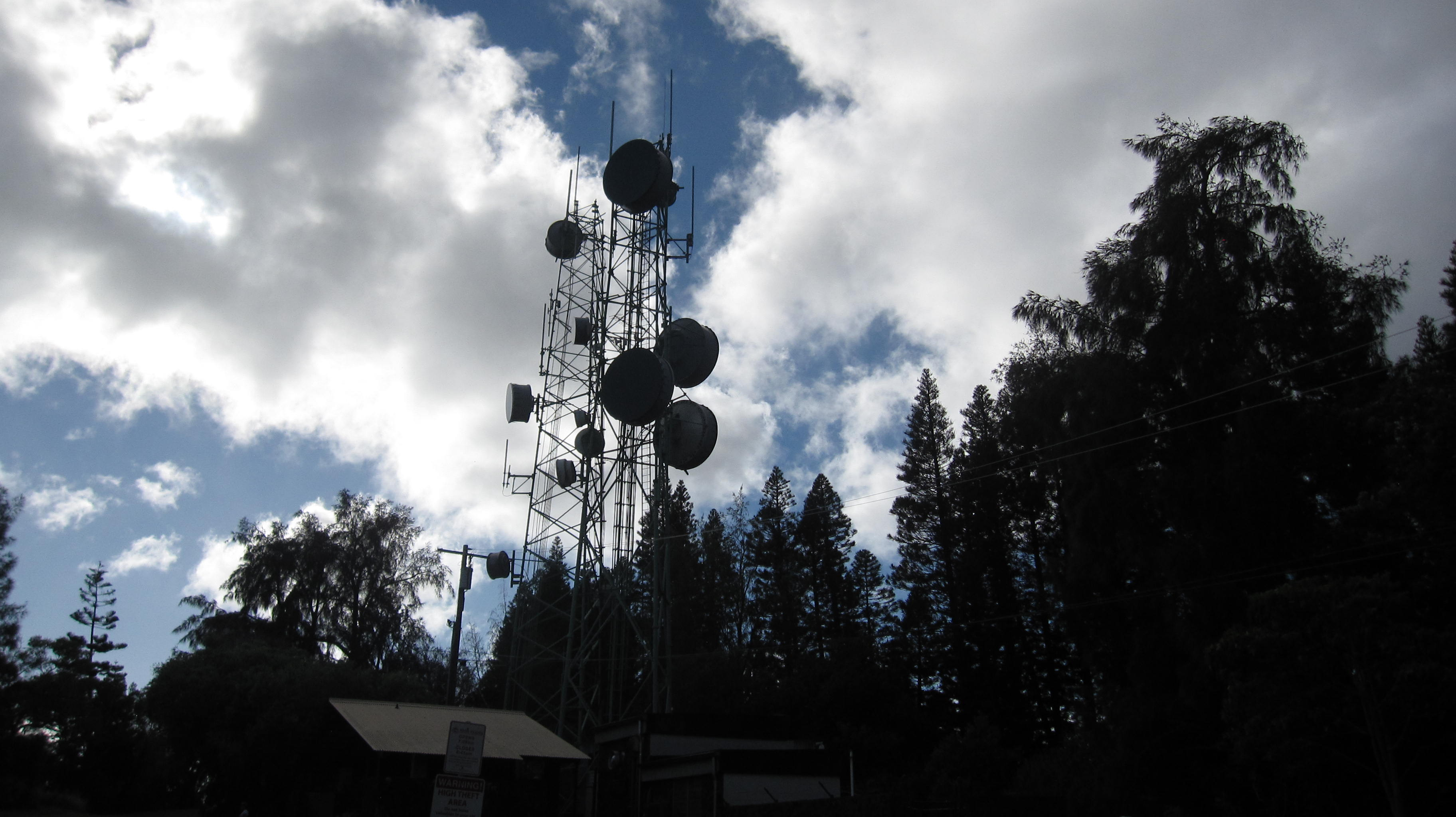
The transmitter site on Puʻu Ohiʻa (Tantalus (Oahu))

HPR operates as two distinct services. "HPR-1," based on KHPR, originally focused on classical music and fine arts programming. "HPR-2," based on KIPO, originally aired NPR news and talk, along with jazz and blues music at night. On February 14, 2017, Hawaii Public Radio realigned its two program services — HPR-1 now carries news and talk and jazz, while HPR-2 switched to classical music. From the very beginning, HPR intended to offer two distinct programming services when it acquired the resources and transmitters to do so. Both services have been streamed live on the Internet since 2001.

In addition to the main signals, there are six low-power translator stations that fill in gaps in coverage. HPR-1 and HPR-2 are also available on cable systems Charter Spectrum (digital channels 864 and 865) and Hawaiian Telcom TV (digital channels 661 and 662) in the entire state of Hawaii.

Until September 2008, the signal of KIPO was limited to 3,000 watts to avoid interference with Federal Communications Commission (FCC) and Federal Aviation Administration (FAA) monitoring stations in Pearl City. This effectively limited its coverage to the south shore of Oahu. A new 26,000 watt transmitter for KIPO went on the air on September 20, 2008, enabling the signal of KIPO to reach all areas of Oahu. Plans are in the works to expand the HPR-2 stream to the other islands as well. In April 2011 KIPM in Wailuku signed as KIPO's satellite outlet. Two more HPR-2 satellites signed on over the next three years, enabling Hawaii Public Radio to realign its services into a true two-channel network.

=== HPR-1 service ===
Call sign	Frequency	City of license	FID	ERP (W)	HAAT	Class	Transmitter coordinates	FCC info
KANO	89.1 FM	Hilo, Hawaii	26449	18,000 horizontal	219.8 m (721 ft)	C2	19°31′14″N 155°17′58″W	LMS
KHPH	88.7 FM	Kailua, Hawaii	173751	6,500 horizontal	931.5 m (3,056 ft)	C0	19°43′15″N 155°55′16″W	LMS
KHPR	88.1 FM	Honolulu, Hawaii	26446	39,000	514 m (1,686 ft)	C0	21°20′0.5″N 157°48′53.1″W	LMS
KIPL	89.9 FM	Lihue, Hawaii	174337	1,000 horizontal	537.4 m (1,763 ft)	C2	21°58′24.3″N 159°29′44.6″W	LMS
KJHF	103.1 FM	Kualapuu, Hawaii	198744	3,400 horizontal	511 m (1,677 ft)	C2	20°50′41″N 156°54′4″W	LMS
KKUA	90.7 FM	Wailuku, Hawaii	26437	14,500 horizontal	1,752 m (5,748 ft)	C	20°42′22.5″N 156°15′38.8″W	LMS

Broadcast translators for HPR-1
Call sign	Frequency	City of license	FID	ERP (W)	HAAT	Class	FCC info	Notes
K203EL	88.5 FM	Haleiwa, Etc., Hawaii	26432	250	714 m (2,343 ft)	D	LMS	Also serves Schofield Barracks
K235CN	94.9 FM	Waimea, Hawaii	144118	10	92 m (302 ft)	D	LMS	On the Big Island

=== HPR-2 service ===
Call sign	Frequency	City of license	FID	ERP (W)	HAAT	Class	Transmitter coordinates	FCC info
KAHU	91.3 FM	Pahala, Hawaii	173928	18,000 horizontal	219.8 m (721 ft)	C2	19°31′14″N 155°17′58″W	LMS
KIPH	88.3 FM	Hana, Hawaii	172436	250 horizontal	−41.7 m (−137 ft)	A	20°45′3.5″N 156°0′17.1″W	LMS
KIPM	89.7 FM	Waikapu, Hawaii	172438	14,500 horizontal	1,752 m (5,748 ft)	C	20°42′22.5″N 156°15′38.8″W	LMS
KIPO	89.3 FM	Honolulu, Hawaii	26440	38,500	514 m (1,686 ft)	C0	21°20′0.5″N 157°48′53.1″W	LMS

Broadcast translators for HPR-2
Call sign	Frequency	City of license	FID	ERP (W)	HAAT	Class	FCC info	Notes
K239BV	95.7 FM	Waimea, Hawaii	144121	110	870 m (2,854 ft)	D	LMS	From Kawaihae to Captain Cook on the Big Island
K264BL	100.7 FM	Honolulu, Hawaii	6902	99 vertical	667.9 m (2,191 ft)	D	LMS	Serves East Oahu
K269GD	101.7 FM	Moloaa, Hawaii	146273	80 vertical	74.6 m (245 ft)	D	LMS	On Kauai
K283CR	104.5 FM	Waimea, Hawaii	144125	100 vertical	91 m (299 ft)	D	LMS	On the Big Island
