= KTOH =

- Kalaheo, Hawaii; United States
- Broadcast area: Kauaʻi, Hawaii
- Frequency: 99.9 MHz (HD Radio)
- Branding: Rooster Country

Programming
- Format: Country
- Subchannels: HD2: Sunny 101.3 (Classic hits); HD3: 107.9 The X (Active rock)

Ownership
- Owner: H Hawaii Media; (Hochman Hawaii One, Inc.)
- Sister stations: KITH; KJMQ; KONI; KORL; KORL-FM; KPHI; KQMY; KRKH; KRYL

History
- First air date: 2000; 26 years ago
- Former call signs: KAYI (1997–2000)

Technical information
- Licensing authority: FCC
- Facility ID: 43732
- Class: C3
- ERP: 510 watts
- HAAT: 510 meters (1,670 ft)
- Transmitter coordinates: 21°56′10″N 159°26′43″W
- Translators: HD2: 101.3 K267BW (Kapaa); HD3: 107.9 K300AT (Kalaheo)

Links
- Public license information: Public file; LMS
- Webcast: Listen Live; Listen Live (HD2); Listen Live (HD3)

KTOH (99.9 FM) is a radio station licensed to Kalaheo, Hawaii. Owned by H Hawaii Media, it broadcasts a country music format serving Kauaʻi.

== History ==
The station was assigned the call sign KAYI on November 10, 1997. On November 7, 2000, the station changed its call sign to the current KTOH.

== HD Radio ==
The station operates two HD Radio subchannels, classic hits Sunny 101.3, and active rock 107.9 The X. Both channels' present formats launched in February 2023 to replace oldies and Hawaiian music/tourist information formats respectively. Both stations are simulcast in analog on the low-power translators 101.3 FM/Kapaa and 107.9 FM/Kalaheo respectively.
