= Kamaka Kūkona =

Carlson Kamaka Kūkona, III
- Born: Maui, Hawaii, United States
- Genres: Hawaii; Hawaiian Music
- Occupations: Singer-songwriter; Musician; Record producer; Kumu hula; Educator
- Instruments: Ukulele; Ipu; Kālaʻau; ʻUlīʻulī; ʻIliʻili; Puniu; Pahu Drum; Vocals
- Years active: 2013-present
- Label: Kamaka Kukona

Carlson Kamaka Kūkona, III (born 1978 in Maui, Hawaii), otherwise simply known as Kamaka Kūkona, is an American musician, vocalist, songwriter, record producer, kumu hula (hula teacher), and educator.

In 2013, after years of recording, Kūkona, released his debut album, Hanu ʻAʻala. The album later went on to earn the Male Vocalist of the Year and the Most Promising Artist awards at the 2014 Nā Hōkū Hanohano Awards. Kūkona is one of only six Hawaiian musicians to be awarded both awards on a debut music album.

The success of Hanu ʻAʻala earned a nomination in the 57th Annual Grammy Awards for the Best Regional Roots Music Album. At the time, Kūkona was the only Hawaiian music artist nominated for the category. Due to the merger of multiple regional roots music categories into the Best Regional Roots Music Award in 2011, Hanu ʻAʻala faced increasing odds in the category historically dominated by Louisiana Cajun music. The album ultimately did not win the Grammy Award.

In 2017, Kūkona released his second album, ʻAla Anuhea, featuring a wonderful array of newly composed mele. The album was mixed and recorded by Dave Tucciarone of Seventh Wave Studio. Again, Kūkona was awarded the Male Vocalist of the Year award at the 2018 Nā Hōkū Hanohano Awards.

== Early life ==
Kamaka was five when his mother signed him up for hula lessons, and it quickly became evident that he had a knack for it. It wasn’t long before he caught the eye of hula master Mae Kamāmalu Klein, who invited Kamaka to start the ‘uniki (graduation) process at nineteen — something of a rarity in hula.

== Hālau O Ka Hanu Lehua ==
In 2003, after a successful ʻuniki process, Kūkona opened his own hula hālau, Hālau O Ka Hanu Lehua in Waikapu, Maui. The hālau accepts members of all ages. Hālau O ka Hanu Lehua have made several appearances at hula festivals across Hawaiʻi and Japan. As early as 2007, Hālau o Ka Hanu Lehua have been making regular appearances at the Merrie Monarch Festival in Hilo, Hawaii.

=== Awards ===
==== Merrie Monarch Festival ====
Year	Group	Category	Result	Ref
2007	Kāne	Kahiko	4th Place (534 pts)	

== Discography ==
=== Solo albums ===
- 2013: Hanu ʻAʻala
- 2017: ʻAla Anuhea
- 2020: Kahekeonāpua

== Music Awards & Nominations ==
=== Nā Hōkū Hanohano Awards ===
The Nā Hōkū Hanohano Awards, also known as the "Hōkū Awards", are Hawaii's equivalent to the Grammy Awards. The awards are administered by the Hawai'i Academy of Recording Arts (HARA) and are awarded to the recording artists who exemplify the best work in their class.

Year	Nominee / work	Award	Result
2021	Kahekeonāpua	Hawaiian Music Album of the Year	Nominated
2021	Kahekeonāpua	Hawaiian Language Performance	Nominated
2021	Kahekeonāpua	Engineering Award - Hawaiian	Nominated
2021	Kahekeonāpua	Album of the Year	Nominated
2021	Kahekeonāpua	Male Vocalist of the Year	Nominated
2018	ʻAla Anuhea	Male Vocalist of the Year	Won
2014	Hanu ʻAʻala	Male Vocalist of the Year	Won
2014	Hanu ʻAʻala	Most Promising Artist	Won

=== Grammy Awards ===
Year	Nominee / work	Award	Result
2014	Hanu ʻAʻala	Best Regional Roots	Nominated
