= KHKU =

Radio station in Hanapepe, Hawaii, United States

- Hanapepe, Hawaii; United States
- Broadcast area: Kauai
- Frequency: 94.3 MHz
- Branding: Star 94.3

Programming
- Format: Mainstream AC
- Affiliations: Compass Media Networks; United Stations Radio Networks

Ownership
- Owner: Kauai Broadcast Partners LLC

History
- First air date: June 29, 2018 (as KHKU)
- Former call signs: KZZV (2014–2018)
- Call sign meaning: HaKU

Technical information
- Licensing authority: FCC
- Facility ID: 189523
- Class: C2
- ERP: 2,000 watts
- HAAT: 533 meters (1,749 ft)
- Transmitter coordinates: 21°58′24″N 159°29′45″W

Links
- Public license information: Public file; LMS
- Webcast: Listen Live
- Website: star943.com

KHKU (94.3 FM) is a mainstream AC station licensed to Hanapepe, Hawaii, serving Kauai. The studio and office facility is located at 4357 Rice Street, Suite 201, in downtown Lihu'e, the county seat of Kaua'i County. The station is owned by Kauai Broadcast Partners LLC, whose managing member is Larry Fuss. Syndicated programming includes the Murphy, Sam & Jodi morning show, Throwback Nation Radio with Tony Lorino, Open House Party with Joe Breezy and Intelligence For Your Life with John Tesh. The callsign KHKU is derived from the Hawaiian word "Haku", meaning "Star." It Flips to Christmas Music on November & December.
