= KJMQ =

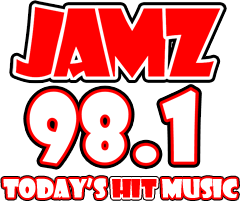
- Lihue, Hawaii; United States
- Broadcast area: Kauaʻi, Hawaii
- Frequency: 98.1 MHz
- Branding: Jamz 98.1

Programming
- Format: Contemporary hit radio

Ownership
- Owner: Hochman Hawaii Four, Inc.
- Sister stations: KITH; KONI; KORL-FM; KPHI; KRKH; KQMY; KRYL; KTOH

History
- First air date: 1997 (as KAWV)
- Former call signs: KAWV (1997–2007)

Technical information
- Licensing authority: FCC
- Facility ID: 49898
- Class: C3
- ERP: 450 watts
- HAAT: 510 meters (1,670 ft)
- Transmitter coordinates: 21°59′41″N 159°24′36″W

Links
- Public license information: Public file; LMS
- Webcast: Listen Live

KJMQ (98.1 FM "Jamz 98.1") is a radio station broadcasting a top 40/CHR format. Licensed to Lihue, Hawaii, United States, the station is owned by James Primm.

== History ==
The station went on the air as KAWV on 1997-08-01. On 2007-10-04, the station changed its call sign to the current KJMQ.

== Radio Personalities ==
KJMQ airs the syndicated Danny and Kait in The Morning.
