= KAOI (AM) =

- Kihei, Hawaii; United States
- Broadcast area: Maui, Hawaii
- Frequency: 1110 kHz
- Branding: KAOI 1110 AM 96.7 FM

Programming
- Format: Talk radio
- Affiliations: CBS News Radio; Fox News Radio; Genesis Communications Network; Premiere Networks; Westwood One

Ownership
- Owner: Akamai Broadcasting
- Sister stations: KHEI-FM, KIXK, KKHI, KNUQ, KSRR

History
- First air date: October 11, 1979

Technical information
- Licensing authority: FCC
- Facility ID: 70381
- Class: B
- Power: 5,000 watts
- Translator: See § Translator
- Repeater: 103.9 KNUQ-HD4 (Paauilo)

Links
- Public license information: Public file; LMS
- Website: www.akamaidailynews.com/kaoi

KAOI (1110 kHz) is an AM radio station located in Kihei, Maui County, Hawaii, owned by Akamai Broadcasting. It broadcasts nationally syndicated and local talk shows.

Former logo

== Translator ==
Broadcast translator for KAOI
Call sign	Frequency	City of license	FID	ERP (W)	HAAT	Class	Transmitter coordinates	FCC info
K244AG	96.7 FM	Maui, Hawaii	33392	250	407 m (1,335 ft)	D	20°38′18″N 156°23′21″W	LMS
