= KAIM-FM =

Radio station in Honolulu, Hawai'i

Honolulu, Hawaii; United States
- Broadcast area: Honolulu metropolitan area
- Frequency: 95.5 MHz
- Branding: Air1

Programming
- Format: Christian worship
- Affiliations: Air1

Ownership
- Owner: Educational Media Foundation
- Sister stations: KLUU

History
- First air date: November 1, 1953
- Call sign meaning: Kaimukī

Technical information
- Licensing authority: FCC
- Facility ID: 10950
- Class: C
- ERP: 100,000 watts
- HAAT: 565 meters
- Transmitter coordinates: 21.393°N 158.097°W

Links
- Public license information: Public file; LMS
- Webcast: Listen Live
- Website: air1.com

KAIM-FM (95.5 FM "Air1") is a Christian worship radio station based in Honolulu, Hawaii. The Educational Media Foundation outlet broadcasts with an ERP of 100 kW. Its studios are in Honolulu's Kalihi district, and its transmitter is near Akupu, Hawaii.

== History ==
KAIM was the first commercial FM radio station in Hawaii, and the second FM station in the state. It went on the air November 1, 1953, having narrowly been beaten out by KVOK-FM for the distinction of being the first FM on the islands. The Christian Broadcasting Association, owned by the Reverend Billy Graham, owned KAIM and broadcast from studios and a transmitter on 12th Avenue in the Kaimuki neighborhood, which gave rise to its callsign. An FM suffix was added in 1956, to coincide with the launch of KAIM on 870 AM; that station is today KHCM 880.

Even though KAIM has been a contemporary Christian outlet since 1992, it wasn't until after Salem bought the station in 2000, that it adopted "The Fish" moniker and slogan.

On March 21, 2024, Salem announced it would sell KAIM-FM to the Educational Media Foundation. Upon closure of the sale, the station will continue broadcasting the contemporary Christian format, but will shift to EMF's Air 1 network, until then heard in Hawaii on KLUU-HD2 and translator 105.5 K288FB Honolulu.
