= KIPA (AM) =

Radio station in Hilo, Hawaii

- Hilo, Hawaii; United States
- Broadcast area: East Side Big Island
- Frequency: 1060 kHz
- Branding: CSN

Programming
- Format: Christian radio
- Affiliations: CSN International

Ownership
- Owner: CSN International

History
- First air date: December 27, 1984
- Former call signs: KAHU (1984–2003); KHBC (2003–2009)
- Call sign meaning: "Welcome"

Technical information
- Licensing authority: FCC
- Facility ID: 33324
- Class: D
- Power: 1,000 watts day
- Transmitter coordinates: 19°41′36.8″N 155°2′55.2″W
- Translator: (99.3 MHz) K257GV (Hilo)

Links
- Public license information: Public file; LMS
- Webcast: Listen Live
- Website: www.csnradio.com

KIPA (1060 AM) is a radio station on the Big Island of Hawai'i whose call sign dates back to 1947, and broadcasts a Christian format as an owned an operated affiliate of CSN International. Licensed to Hilo, Hawaii, United States, the station serves the Hilo market and surrounding areas.

== History ==
The 1060 AM frequency went on the air as KAHU on December 27, 1984. On March 19, 2003, the station changed its call sign to Hilo's original call letters est. 1936, KHBC. In June 2009, the station changed its call sign to relaunch the heritage station, KIPA (call letters established 1947 at 620 AM), and reassigned "KHBC" to its FM sister station on 92.7 FM in Hilo (formerly KHWI). The calls "KHWI" were later moved to its new sister station in Kailua-Kona at 92.1 FM. In 2020, KIPA was sold to Calvary Chapel of Twin Falls, along with the construction permit for translator 99.3 K257GV, for $80,000.
