= KIXK =

- Wailuku, Hawaii; United States
- Broadcast area: Maui, Hawaii
- Frequency: 95.1 MHz
- Branding: Kix 95.1

Programming
- Format: Country
- Affiliations: Fox News Radio; Compass Media Networks; United Stations Radio Networks; Westwood One

Ownership
- Owner: Akamai Broadcasting
- Sister stations: KAOI; KHEI-FM; KEWE; KNUQ; KSRR

History
- First air date: June 10, 1974
- Former call signs: KAOI, KAOI-FM (1974–2024)
- Call sign meaning: "Kix"

Technical information
- Licensing authority: FCC
- Facility ID: 70375
- Class: C1
- ERP: 3,500 watts horizontal polarization only
- HAAT: 933.1 meters (3,061 ft)
- Transmitter coordinates: 20°46′31″N 156°14′49″W
- Translators: 96.5 K243BY (Honokawai); 97.7 K249EH (Honokowa)

Links
- Public license information: Public file; LMS
- Webcast: Listen live
- Website: www.akamaidailynews.com/kix951/

KIXK (95.1 MHz, "Kix 95.1") is a radio station licensed to Wailuku, Hawaii, United States. Owned by Akamai Broadcasting, it broadcasts a country music format.

== History ==
On February 3, 1970, Kirk Munroe applied to the Federal Communications Commission (FCC) for permission to build a new FM radio station in Wailuku, Hawaii. The application was designated for comparative hearing before being granted on December 22, 1971. It began broadcasting on June 10, 1974, as KAOI (from the slogan "Maui no ka oi", or "Maui's best"). It was the first FM radio station to be established on a Hawaiian island other than Oahu. The station originally broadcast easy listening music with news reports every 30 minutes. In addition to owning KAOI, Munroe—who had previously started radio stations in California and Florida—acquired the Maui Weekly tabloid in 1979. By the early 1980s, KAOI had shifted from easy listening to an album-oriented rock format. In 1986, the station was sold to a company headed by Roger Whitehurst, who had previously owned cable television systems in Texas.

John Detz, through his Visionary Related Entertainment, acquired KAOI-FM in 1990 for $650,000. Visionary grew into Hawaii's largest radio station operator and expanded the reach of KAOI. By 1996, it was broadcast on translators with signal coverage encompassing the islands of Hawaii, Oʻahu, and Maui as well as Kapaʻa on Kauaʻi, and Visionary also owned three other FM radio stations in Kona and Upcountry Maui. The coverage on Oʻahu and Kauaʻi came about when Visionary purchased KGMZ (107.9 FM) in the Honolulu area in 1993 and flipped it to a rebroadcast of KAOI-FM's signal. In 1997, KGMZ separated from KAOI when Visionary leased it out. Visionary sold off its stations not serving Maui in 2010 as part of a financial settlement with Jason R. Wolff of Frontier Radio Management. By 2011, KAOI had an adult album alternative format.

Akamai Broadcasting of Hawaii, a company owned by Larry Fuss, acquired the Visionary Related Entertainment stations on Maui for $800,000. Six format changes in the cluster followed, including KAOI switching to country music under the new call sign KIXK.

== Gallery ==
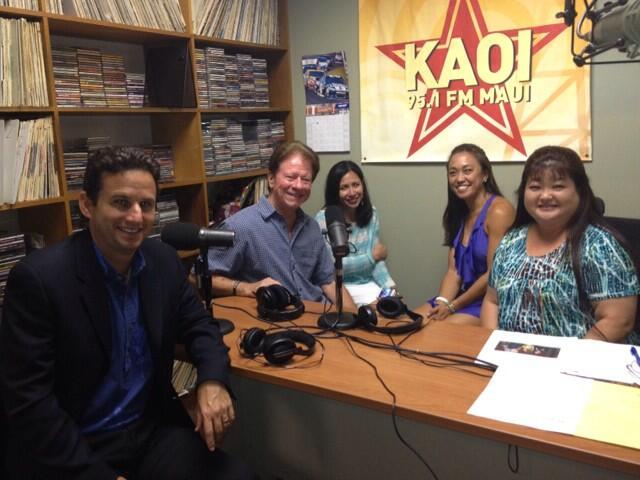
Brian Schatz on KAOI-FM
