= KONI (FM) =

- Lanai City, Hawaii; United States
- Broadcast area: Maui, Hawaii
- Frequency: 104.7 MHz
- Branding: KONI 104.7

Programming
- Format: Classic hits
- Affiliations: ABC News Radio

Ownership
- Owner: HHawaii Media; (Hochman Hawaii Publishing, Inc.)
- Sister stations: KITH, KJMQ, KORL-FM, KPHI, KRKH, KRYL, KTOH, KQMY (FM)

History
- First air date: November 1, 1993

Technical information
- Licensing authority: FCC
- Facility ID: 17023
- Class: C
- ERP: 72,000 watts
- HAAT: 696 meters (2285 feet)
- Transmitter coordinates: 20°39′36″N 156°21′50″W

Links
- Public license information: Public file; LMS
- Website: 104.7 KONI FM

KONI (104.7 MHz) is an FM radio station licensed to serve Lanai City, Hawaii. The station is owned by Hochman Hawaii Publishing, Inc. It airs a classic hits music format.

The station was assigned the KONI call letters by the Federal Communications Commission on May 31, 1991.
