= KITH (FM) =

Hawaiian contemporary hit radio station in Kapaa, Hawaii

- Kapaa, Hawaii; United States
- Broadcast area: Kauai
- Frequency: 98.9 MHz
- Branding: Island 98.9

Programming
- Language: English
- Format: Hawaiian contemporary hit radio

Ownership
- Owner: Hochman Hawaii Two, Inc.
- Sister stations: KJMQ; KONI; KORL-FM; KPHI; KQMY; KRKH; KRYL; KTOH

History
- First air date: August 1, 1997
- Former call signs: KAWT (1997–2000)

Technical information
- Licensing authority: FCC
- Facility ID: 70023
- Class: C3
- ERP: 450 watts
- HAAT: 510 meters (1,670 ft)
- Transmitter coordinates: 21°56′10″N 159°26′43″W

Links
- Public license information: Public file; LMS
- Webcast: Listen live

KITH (98.9 MHz, "Island 98.9") is a commercial FM radio station broadcasting a Hawaiian contemporary hit radio format. Licensed to Kapaa, Hawaii, United States. The station is currently owned by Hochman Hawaii Two, Inc.

== History ==
The station went on the air as KAWT on August 1, 1997. On November 7, 2000, the station changed its call sign to the current KITH.
