= KPOA =

- Lahaina, Hawaii; United States
- Broadcast area: Maui
- Frequency: 93.5 MHz
- Branding: KPOA 93.5 FM

Programming
- Format: Hawaiian adult contemporary

Ownership
- Owner: Pacific Radio Group, Inc.
- Sister stations: KJKS; KJMD; KLHI-FM; KMVI; KNUI

History
- First air date: March 30, 1984; 41 years ago

Technical information
- Licensing authority: FCC
- Facility ID: 35490
- Class: C
- ERP: 72,000 watts
- HAAT: 696.0 meters (2,283.5 ft)
- Transmitter coordinates: 20°39′36″N 156°21′50″W

Links
- Public license information: Public file; LMS
- Webcast: Listen live
- Website: kpoa.com

KPOA (93.5 FM) is a radio station broadcasting a Hawaiian adult contemporary format. Licensed to Lahaina, Hawaii, United States, the station is owned by Pacific Radio Group, Inc.
