= KQMY (FM) =

- Paia, Hawaii; United States
- Broadcast area: Maui, Hawaii
- Frequency: 102.1 MHz
- Branding: Retro 102.1

Programming
- Format: Classic hits

Ownership
- Owner: Hochman Hawaii Communications; (Hochman Hawaii Four, Inc.)
- Sister stations: KITH, KJMQ, KONI, KORL, KPHI, KRKH, KRYL, KTOH

History
- First air date: 2008 (as KLZY at 102.9)
- Former call signs: KLZY (2006–2013); KMKV (2013–2017)
- Former frequencies: 102.9 MHz (2008–2017)

Technical information
- Licensing authority: FCC
- Facility ID: 164113
- Class: C2
- ERP: 900 watts
- HAAT: 1,755 meters
- Transmitter coordinates: 20°39′36″N 156°21′50″W

Links
- Public license information: Public file; LMS
- Webcast: Listen Live

KQMY (102.1 MHz) is an American FM radio station licensed to Paia, Hawaii. The station broadcasts a classic hits format, switching to Christmas music for part of November and December as Christmas 102.1.

The station was assigned the KMKV call letters by the Federal Communications Commission on January 2, 2013. The station changed its call sign to the current KQMY on July 1, 2017. It originally focused on 1980's music, but gradually shifted to include 1990s music by 2021. As of April 11, 2024, the station now consists of a 1990s and 2000s hits format, mirroring the change of its sister station, KORL-HD4.

Logo before addition of some 90s hits
