= KHBC (FM) =

Radio station in Hilo, Hawaii

- Hilo, Hawaii; United States
- Frequency: 92.7 MHz
- Branding: The Wave @ 92FM

Programming
- Format: Hot adult contemporary

Ownership
- Owner: Resonate Broadcasting; (Resonate Hawaii, LLC)
- Sister stations: KHWI, KWYI, KTBH-FM

History
- First air date: May 25, 1989
- Former call signs: KHHI (1989–1991); KAOE (1991–1996); DKAOE (1996–1996); KHWI (1996–2009); KIPA (2009–2009)

Technical information
- Licensing authority: FCC
- Facility ID: 70379
- Class: C3
- ERP: 7,500 watts
- HAAT: -78.0 meters
- Transmitter coordinates: 19°50′19″N 155°6′43″W

Links
- Public license information: Public file; LMS
- Webcast: Listen live
- Website: hawaiiswave.com

KHBC (92.7 MHz) is an FM radio station broadcasting a hot adult contemporary format. Licensed to Hilo, Hawaii, United States, the station is currently owned by Australia-based Resonate Broadcasting.

== History ==
The station went on the air as KHHI on May 25, 1989. On December 16, 1991, the station changed its call sign to KAOE, on August 7, 1996 to DKAOE, on December 19, 1996 to KHWI, on May 11, 2009 to KIPA, and on May 22, 2009 to the current KHBC.
