= KRYL =

- Haiku, Hawaii; United States
- Broadcast area: Maui County, Hawaii
- Frequency: 106.5 MHz
- Branding: Y106.5

Programming
- Language: English
- Format: Country
- Affiliations: Dial Global

Ownership
- Owner: HHawaii Media; (Hochman Hawaii Five, Inc.)
- Sister stations: KITH, KJMQ, KONI, KORL-FM, KPHI, KRKH, KTOHKQMY

History
- First air date: 2008
- Former call signs: KUHI (2007–2009)

Technical information
- Licensing authority: FCC
- Facility ID: 164100
- Class: C1
- ERP: 340 watts
- HAAT: 1,781 meters (5,843 ft)
- Transmitter coordinates: 20°42′22.5″N 156°15′38.8″W

Links
- Public license information: Public file; LMS
- Webcast: Listen Live

KRYL (106.5 FM, "Y106.5") is an American radio station licensed to serve the community of Haiku, Hawaii, United States. The station, established in 2008, is currently owned by HHawaii Media and the broadcast license is held by Hochman Hawaii Five, Inc. Mostly off the air during the first 18 months after it debuted, the station began regular broadcast operations as a smooth jazz station in August 2009 before switching to country in March 2010.

== Programming ==
KRYL broadcasts a country music format to Maui County, Hawaii. A portion of this programming comes via satellite from Dial Global. Previously, the station had operated intermittently from its February 2008 launch until beginning regular broadcasting with a smooth jazz music format in August 2009. The station flipped to the current country format in March 2010.

== History ==
=== Launch ===
After more than seven years of delays, the Federal Communications Commission (FCC) individually auctioned off the right to build more than 200 new FM radio stations in a process called "FM Auction 37" beginning in November 2004. There were four bidders for the right to build a new station serving Haiku, Hawaii, at 106.5 FM. This right was won by Joel Sellers of New Orleans, Louisiana, through her company Big Island Broadcasting, Inc. The winning gross bid was reported as $1,667,000.

In December 2004, successful bidders Big Island Broadcasting, Inc., applied to the FCC for a construction permit for a new broadcast radio station. The FCC granted this permit on February 24, 2005, with a scheduled expiration date of February 24, 2008. The new station was assigned call sign "KUHI" on December 21, 2007. After tower construction and testing were completed, the station applied for its broadcast license on February 22, 2008, and this was granted on February 26, 2008. However, in the rush to beat the expiration of the construction permit, the station's main radio studios were not yet completed so KUHI began broadcasting under program test authority from a temporary facility.

=== Falling silent ===
Just days later, on February 29, 2008, the station fell silent. Big Island Broadcasting told the FCC that it needed more time, possibly up to six additional months, to complete "location and construction of its main studios" and to complete the hiring of staff for the station. After notifying the FCC on March 26, 2008, the station applied for special temporary authority to remain silent while these issues were resolved. The Commission granted this authority on April 7, 2008, with a scheduled expiration of October 4, 2008. The station resumed broadcast operations from its new studio location on January 12, 2009.

A few weeks later, on February 11, 2009, KUHI fell silent again. In their filing with the FCC, Big Island Broadcasting asserted that it needed to modify its broadcast transmitter and other transmission equipment but that the transmitter had been built by a foreign company that had since gone out of business. Citing the need for custom fabricated parts, the station believed that it could be back on the air in less than 90 days. The Commission held off on granting the new special temporary authority until July 9, 2009. If the station did not resume broadcasting by February 12, 2010, its license would be subject to automatic forfeiture.

=== KRYL era ===
After the station returned to the air on August 24, 2009, it applied to the FCC for a new call sign. The station was assigned current "KRYL" call sign on September 1, 2009. On August 25, after several brief periods of broadcasting over the previous 18 months, the station formally launched regular broadcast operations as a simulcast of KORL-FM, broadcasting a smooth jazz music format. The station's programming included a mix of local air personalities (including Johnny Miro in morning drive) and the syndicated Smooth Jazz Network from Broadcast Architecture. In March 2010, KRYL dropped the smooth jazz format in favor of country music programming.

In October 2010, Big Island Broadcasting, Inc., reached an agreement to sell KRYL to HHawaii Media subsidiary Hochman Hawaii Five, Inc., for $450,000 in cash plus stock in the purchasing company. At the time, Hochman was already operating KRYL under a local marketing agreement. The FCC approved the sale on November 30, 2010, and the transaction was formally consummated on March 3, 2011.
