= KKHI (FM) =

- Kaunakakai, Hawaii; United States
- Broadcast area: Maui
- Frequency: 95.9 MHz

Programming
- Format: Christian Contemporary
- Network: K-Love

Ownership
- Owner: Educational Media Foundation

History
- Former call signs: KMKK-FM (2006–2015); KNIT (2015–2016)
- Former frequencies: 102.3 MHz (2007–2016)

Technical information
- Licensing authority: FCC
- Facility ID: 164280
- Class: C1
- ERP: 19,000 watts
- HAAT: 513 meters (1,683 ft)
- Transmitter coordinates: 20°50′30″N 156°53′54″W

Links
- Public license information: Public file; LMS

KKHI (95.9 FM) is a radio station broadcasting the K-Love Christian Contemporary format, licensed to Kaunakakai, Hawaii, United States. Its original call sign of KMKK-FM was licensed in April 2006. It changed its call sign to KNIT on April 24, 2015, and again to the current KKHI on January 26, 2016. The big signal of KKHI broadcasts Christian Contemporary music from Molokai to Maui. The station is owned by Educational Media Foundation.
