= KSHK =

Radio station in Hanamaulu, Hawaii

- Hanamaulu, Hawaii; United States
- Broadcast area: Kauai
- Frequency: 103.1 MHz
- Branding: Shaka 103

Programming
- Format: Classic rock

Ownership
- Owner: Pacific Media Group; (Pacific Radio Group, Inc.)

History
- First air date: September 20, 1989 (as KAUI at 103.3)
- Former call signs: KAUI (1989–1999)
- Former frequencies: 103.3 MHz (1989–2014)

Technical information
- Licensing authority: FCC
- Facility ID: 62228
- Class: C1
- ERP: 51,000 watts
- HAAT: 30 metres (98 ft 5 in)
- Transmitter coordinates: 21°56′11″N 159°26′43″W

Links
- Public license information: Public file; LMS
- Webcast: Listen Live
- Website: shaka103.com

KSHK (103.1 FM) is a radio station broadcasting a classic rock format. Licensed to Hanamaulu, Hawaii, United States, the station serves the Kauai area. The station is currently owned by Pacific Media Group, through licensee Pacific Radio Group, Inc.

The station is an affiliate of the syndicated Floydian Slip Pink Floyd show. The station has an eclectic mix of rock and roll, mostly classic. The Alice Cooper syndicated radio show is featured daily. Little Steven's Underground Garage radio show is also featured.

== History ==
The station went on the air as KAUI on September 20, 1989. On March 8, 1999, the station changed its call sign to the current KSHK.
