= KUAI =

Radio station in Eleele, Hawaii

- Eleele, Hawaii; United States
- Broadcast area: Kauai
- Frequency: 570 kHz

Programming
- Format: "Real Country" 70s 80s 90s early 2000s
- Affiliations: CBS Radio

Ownership
- Owner: Pacific Media Group; (Pacific Radio Group, Inc.)

History
- First air date: 1939
- Former call signs: KIVM (?-1982); KIPO (1982–1987); KQNG (1987–2015)
- Call sign meaning: KaUAI

Technical information
- Licensing authority: FCC
- Facility ID: 58938
- Class: B
- Power: 1,000 watts
- Transmitter coordinates: 21°59′19.7″N 159°24′11″W
- Translator: 104.5 K283CQ (Lihue)

Links
- Public license information: Public file; LMS
- Webcast: Listen Live
- Website: KUAI website

KUAI (570 AM) is a radio station broadcasting a "real country" format covering music from roughly 1970-2010. Licensed to Eleele in the U.S. state of Hawaii, the station serves the Kauai area. The station is currently owned by Pacific Media Group, through licensee Pacific Radio Group, Inc.

== History ==
On February 1, 1987, the station changed its call sign to KQNG. The station changed to the current KUAI call sign on March 17, 2015.
