= 2016 in radio =

The following is a list of events affecting radio broadcasting in 2016. Events listed include radio program debuts, finales, cancellations, and station launches, closures and format changes, as well as information about controversies.

== Notable events ==
=== January ===
| Date | Event |
|---|---|
| 1 | Classic Hits WMXJ Miami relaunches with a 80s-based format as "102.7 The Beach." |
| 1 | KBIU Lake Charles, Louisiana drops AC for Rhythmic Top 40 as "Hot 103.3." The flip brings the format back to the market after it was dropped by Nash Icon sibling KQLK in September 2014. |
| 1 | After dropping the "Nash Icon" format for Christmas music as "Warm 98.9", then stunted again with AC on December 26, followed by a series of hints of yet another flip via Twitter, W255CJ in Atlanta flipped back to Alternative and revived the "99X" branding. |
| 4 | The Denver radio market will see the number of sports stations increase to five, with the addition of former Oldies KRWZ (the flagship station of the Denver Nuggets, Colorado Avalanche and Colorado Rapids; the flip to take place April 5), and former Talk KDSP & K300CP (the flagship station for the Denver Broncos). KDSP will also take the Fox Sports Radio affiliation from KKFN and KEPN, the latter becoming a full-time affiliate of ESPN Radio on the same day. |
| 4 | KFMB-FM San Diego, which dropped the Adult Top 40 format and Jack FM branding after 10 years and began stunting with a wheel of formats on December 26, 2015, debuted a Mainstream Rock format, branded as "KFM-BFM 100.7." |
| 4 | WFWI Fort Wayne, Indiana relaunched with hybrid Classic Adult Hits as "Big 92.3." |
| 5 | For the first time since sister station KTWN-FM flipped to Top 40 in 2010, the Minneapolis-St. Paul radio market picks up a Rhythmic Top 40 outlet, as KNOF drops its longtime Christian Contemporary format to become "Go 95.3," with an emphasis on cutting-edge artists and local content. |
| 6 | The KFWB License Trust announces the sale of Sports Talk KFWB/Los Angeles to Mercury Capital Partners, who'll flip the station to brokered multicultural programming. The move will leave the LA Galaxy without an English-language radio station, forcing the team to resort to Internet-only game broadcasts; the Los Angeles Clippers' broadcasts will move to KEIB. |
| 7 | Rhythmic-leaning Top 40/CHR KTFM/San Antonio is relaunched with a new branding, adopting Alpha Media's "Energy" moniker. |
| 14 | Pittsburgh Public Media acquires Rhythmic Oldies WZUM, which will flip to Jazz as a simulcast of WYZR, which is expected to sign on later this year. |
| 19 | iHeart Media shuffles its cluster lineup in the Puget Sound region. KYNW/Centralia flips from Adult Top 40 to Alternative as "Alt 102.9," which in turn results in KBKS-FM/Tacoma shifting from Top 40/CHR to Adult Top 40, with the former format moving to 93.3 and relaunched as "Power 93.3" (new calls to be KPWK), which results in KUBE-FM/Seattle and its Rhythmic Top 40 format to relocate to 104.9, replacing KKBW/Eatonville-Tacoma's Active Rock format. |
| 27 | WHTI Richmond flips from AC to Classic Hits as "Star 100.9," giving the Virginia capital city its second Classic Hits outlet as it takes on WBBT-FM |

=== February ===
| Date | Event |
|---|---|
| 1 | WYVL Youngsville, Pennsylvania and WTWT/Bradford, Pennsylvania both flip from classic Christian rock to contemporary Christian music. |
| 5 | CHIQ-FM Winnipeg rebrands from "Fab 94.3" to "94.3 The Drive" as it shifts from oldies/classic hits to classic hits with an emphasis on '70s and '80s music. |
| 11 | The Mark Levin Show signs a "lifetime contract" with Westwood One that will see the show continue to be carried on the network through at least 2025. |
| 12 | Top 40/CHR WKSZ Green Bay adds a simulcast for Appleton and the Fox Cities, where sister station WKZY//Chilton replaces the Adult Hits simulcast of WKZG. In addition, WKSZ brings back the morning team of Doug & Mary to replace the duo of Precious & Nikki, the former going to nights, the latter to sales for owner Woodward Communications. |
| 13 | Former KNAC on-air personality Stew Herrera launches the Saturday-night program Horns Up on KLOS in Los Angeles. Similar to KNAC, Horns Up plays a variety of hard rock, heavy metal and classic rock music. |
| 17 & 18 | Univision Radio swaps callsigns and formats on 2 of its stations in Dallas/Fort Worth. 99.1 now receives the KFZO callsign while 107.9 gets the KDXX call letters on February 17. The stations are now swapped to Regional Mexican as "La Jefa 99.1" and Latin pop as a simulcast of KESS-FM "Latino Mix" respectively the following day. |
| 24 | After nearly 11 months as an Adult Top 40, WLDB Milwaukee shifts back to AC and revives the "B93.3" moniker. |
| 25 | Adult Alternative CKUL-FM Halifax flips to Adult Top 40 as "Mix 96.5," putting the station in direct competition with rival station CIOO-FM. |
| 26 | CFXJ-FM Toronto goes jockless in anticipation to make an expected shift from classic hip-hop after just a little over a year. On February 29, the station flipped to Rhythmic AC as "93.5 The Move." |
| 29 | WIVG Memphis drops Classic Hip-Hop for Alternative as "i96." |
| 29 | After a 22-month run with Adult Alternative, CHPK-FM Calgary flips to Country as "Wild 95.3," giving the market its second Country outlet as it takes on market leader CKRY-FM. |

=== March ===
| Date | Event |
|---|---|
| 1 | WSTK New Bern, North Carolina drops its Urban Gospel format to simulcast Dance Top 40 WEGG |
| 1 | Cumulus Media pulls the plug on KSJO San Jose/San Francisco's Nash FM Country format and moves it to the HD2 subchannel of Classic Rock sister KSAN. KSJO replaced the format with Bollywood music using the moniker "Bolly 92.3." |
| 4 | Reno picks up its second Classic Hip-Hop outlet, as KLCA-HD3 & K223AL drops Active Rock to become "Power 92.5." |
| 7 | Sheridan Broadcasting announced that they are filing for Chapter 11 Bankruptcy, as the Pittsburgh-based syndicator fights off a legal battle with Access 1 Communications (through its subsidiary NBN Broadcasting) over ownership of American Urban Radio Networks, which Sheridan owns a 51% stake in and is trying to buy out the remaining 49% that is being contested by Access 1. On May 17, Access.1 acquired AURN as part of a settlement deal with Sheridan, who'll continue to own the news and sports operations with AURN handling core programming and affiliate sales. |
| 7 | Just one year after relaunching with Adult Top 40 and changing owners, KNXR/Rochester, Minnesota flips to Classic Rock Hits as "Minnesota 97.5," and joins a crowded field that includes Oldies KVGO and Classic Rock KRCH. |
| 9 | Univision Radio begins rebranding its Regional Mexican stations. KSCA/Los Angeles, KOND/Fresno and KISF/Las Vegas are monikered as "ZonaMX," KGBT-FM McAllen, Texas adopts the "LaJefa" moniker, and "Que Buena" will become the identifier for WQBU-FM: New York City, KROM: San Antonio, KLNO: Dallas-Ft. Worth, KSOL/KSQL-FM: San Jose/San Francisco, KLQB: Austin, WOJO: Chicago, KHOT-FM: Phoenix and KLNV: San Diego. |
| 10 | Premiere Networks announces the syndication of its first non-iHeartMedia produced program with the national distribution of the KQMV/Seattle morning show Brooke & Jubal, which already has four stations airing the program. |
| 11 | After eight years of Oldies, WQKS-FM Montgomery flips to AC as "Kiss 96.1." |
| 11 | After a five-year run with Modern AC, KLCK-FM Seattle drops the format and begins stunting and uses the Rickrolling ploy to keep everyone guessing. At Noon on March 16, The Hubbard Broadcasting station flipped to Mainstream Rock as KVRQ, "Rock 98.9," and joined a crowded field of Rock outlets that includes rival KISW, Alternatives KNDD and KFOO, and Classic Rock KZOK. |
| 15 | CBS Radio returns the WNEW-FM calls to New York City and to its original home at 102.7 after a nine-year absence (CBS moved the calls to West Palm Beach and recently to Annapolis during that time). |
| 15 | CBS Corporation confirmed reports that it is planning to spin off its CBS Radio division within the next year. The move would put 117 stations in 26 markets up for sale, making it attractive to buyers. |
| 16 | KIKI/ Honolulu drops Conservative Talk to become a Fox Sports Radio affiliate, and will serve as the Hawaii affiliate for the Los Angeles Dodgers and Tennessee Titans (the latter due to Honolulu-born Marcus Mariota being the team's quarterback). |
| 18 | After spending the last two years with Adult Top 40, WMIA-FM/ Miami returns to Rhythmic Hot AC, billed as "93.9MIA." |
| 21 | Two rival classic hits stations in Central New York, WZUN/Phoenix, New York and WSEN-FM/Baldwinsville, New York, merge. The resulting station will occupy WZUN's license and frequency (102.1), use WSEN-FM's call sign and carry the music library and airstaff of both stations. WSEN-FM's former frequency of 92.1 was spun off to the religious Family Life Network, who in turn traded the station to Craig Fox in exchange for WOLF-FM (105.1)/De Ruyter and WWLF-FM (96.7)/Oswego. WOLF's country music format and calls will then move to 92.1, with Family Life's programming moving onto 105.1 and 96.7, marking the first inroads into Central New York for the religious broadcaster. |
| 24 | After three years with Top 40/CHR, WZJZ/Fort Myers, Florida shifts to Adult Top 40 with emphasis on 90s and Y2K recurrents. |
| 30 | Emmis Communications' WQHT/New York City becomes the first radio station in the United States to license its annual concert series to another country, as Japan's Avex Live Creative will hold the inaugural "Hot 97 Summer Jam Tokyo" event on July 29 at Zepp Tokyo. |
| 31 | In Salt Lake City, KUDD's Top 40 format migrates to KAUU, giving them better signal coverage. Rhythmic Top 40 sister KUUU is expected to move down from 92.5 to 92.3 once its greenlighted by the FCC. |

=== April ===
| Date | Event |
|---|---|
| 1 | John McMurray, a meteorologist at WJRT-TV Flint/Tri-Cities, Michigan (whose reports were also syndicated on several Michigan radio stations, earning him the nickname "Michigan's Weatherman"), retires after 47 years on the air. |
| 4 | After eight years of Spanish Religious, KOTK Omaha returns to Conservative Talk and replaces the FM translator broadcast of Christian Preaching sister KCRO with a simulcast, billing themselves as "94.5/1260 The Answer." |
| 5 | KGO/810 San Francisco relaunches its News/Talk format with a newly revamped direction and new lineup. The Cumulus Media outlet dismissed the entire air staff March 31 and began stunting in anticipation of the changeover. Originally, 40-year veteran Ronn Owens was expected to join Conservative Talk sister KSFO/560 for afternoons, remains with KGO due to a clause in his contract that prevents him from going to another station. |
| 6 | A trio of Entercom's San Francisco Bay Area stations, Sports KGMZ, Urban AC KBLX-FM, and Classic Rock KUFX, will start simulcasting Oakland Raiders broadcasts as part of an extended deal. KGMZ, who had been the flagship station for the Raiders since 2012, will continue in that capacity. |
| 6 | Northern Kentucky University announced that they are exploring a possible sale of WNKU/Highland Heights, Kentucky and satellite sisters WNKN/Middletown, Ohio and WNKE/New Boston, Ohio. The move comes in the wake of significant funding cuts from the state of Kentucky, as Governor Matt Bevin is proposing a 4.5% budget cut for Kentucky's colleges and universities, thus affecting the stations' future. |
| 7 | Margaret Carole Bowen, a former General Sales Manager for CBS Radio's Country WKIS/Miami, files a lawsuit against the company for age discrimination, claiming that eight months after she was "Let Go" by CBS Radio after its acquisition of Beasley Broadcasting's Miami stations, retained the jobs of two GSMs who are younger than she is (both are in their 40s, including one that had been with the company after less than a year). Bowen, who is 59, also claims that two former employees, both 61 and 57, were also forced out in favor of younger personnel. |
| 13 | KISQ/San Francisco's 19-year tenure with Rhythmic AC/Oldies comes to an end, as the iHeart Media outlet flips to AC as "98.1 The Breeze." |
| 13 | WHBL/Sheboygan, Wisconsin launches an FM translator at 101.5, W268BR/Sheboygan, carrying its news/talk format with a minor rebranding to "1330 & 101.5, WHBL". |
| 18 | KYWY/Cheyenne, Wyoming shifts from Adult Top 40 to AC as "Star 92.9." |
| 19 | Davis Media sells one of its Columbia, South Carolina stations, WWNU, to Radio Training Network, who will flip the station to Christian AC in May. Davis was expected to move WWNU's Adult Alternative format to Country WWNQ, but on May 25 announced that the latter would be sold to Midlands Media Group, who plans to retain the existing format. |
| 21 | Soft AC KIFM/San Diego rebrands from "Easy 98.1" to "Sunny 98.1" and adjusts its direction to a broader current AC presentation. |
| 22 | Educational Media Foundation adds another Air1 satellite affiliate to its lineup with the purchase of CP KIMI/Malvern, Iowa. The station will cover the Omaha market at the 107.7 frequency, which has been a subject of disputes between the previous two applicants and the Federal Aviation Administration over the signal itself. |
| 24 | Nash FM formatted WRKN: LaPlace/New Orleans repositions its branding to Adult-leaning Country as it expand its coverage to Baton Rouge due to the station's signal coverage. |
| 25 | Community Wireless officially launches Adult Alternative "107.9 The Mountain" on the newly acquired KUMT/Randolph-Salt Lake City, but a dispute on May 5 resulted in Community Wireless terminating its deal with operator Mike Summers to oversee the station. Community Wireless will take over operations in the coming days. |
| 26 | Wilks Broadcasting officially ceases as a company with the sale of its 3 Reno outlets to different operators. Country KWFP and Classic Rock KURK are sold to Reno-based Evans Broadcasting Company, while Lotus Broadcasting adds Adult Alternative KTHX-FM to its six-station cluster in the market. |
| 27 | iHeartMedia and the Los Angeles Dodgers restructure their ownership arrangement of KLAC/Los Angeles. The Sports outlet will be spun off into a new company, Los Angeles Radio Partners, with iHeart owning 51% and Dodgers-owned LARadioCo increasing its stake to 49%. As part of this deal, iHeart has agreed not to launch a competing Sports station in the Los Angeles market for the next 15 years without the Dodgers' consent. |
| 28 | KDCO/Denver adds an FM translator at 104.7, allowing the "Mile High Sports" outlet to cover the areas not served by the AM. |
| 29 | In a surprise prank posted on YouTube in which the general manager was about to fire the midday personality, it was actually an announcement to listeners from WTUG-FM/Tuscaloosa, Alabama that they are flipping from Urban AC to R&B/Hip-Hop on this day and the air staffer was promoted to PD effective with the flip. |

=== May ===
| Date | Event |
|---|---|
| 2 | Entercom scores a major deal to broadcast San Diego Padres games for the next five years on Alternative KBZT, starting with the 2017 season, ending XEPRS-AM's 12-year run with the National League West franchise, which ends this year. |
| 2 | KABQ-FM: Bosque Farms/Albuquerque drops Classic Hits for 1980s' music. |
| 2 | KLLE: Fresno drops Hispanic Rhythmic for Regional Mexican as "Zona MX 107.9," with sister KOND now skewing older material. |
| 4 | After 33 years, "Coach" Larry Price announced that he will no longer serve as co-host of Perry & Price on AC KSSK-FM Honolulu, as he will return to doing sports broadcasting as a host of a weekly show on sister station KIKI. Michael W. Perry, his long time partner, will continue as a solo host at KSSK. |
| 5 | In the Philippines, two controversial advertisements are broadcast, financed by Antonio Trillanes IV and targeting presidential candidate Rodrigo Duterte. |
| 9 | KIXX Country 97.1 CKLN-FM launches in Clarenville, Newfoundland & Labrador. |
| 11 | The Active Rock format of WTFX-FM Louisville relocates to the HD2 subchannel of WQMF, whose main HD1 channel also flips from Classic Rock to Mainstream Rock effective with the change. Later the same day, WTFX flipped to urban as "93.1 The Beat" to challenge Alpha Media's WGZB, who is taking overall market share away from WTFX's sister stations WHAS and WAMZ. |
| 12 | Educational Media Foundation expands its presence in the Boise market with the purchase of Oldies KKOO and Spanish Adult Hits KWEI. Both stations will become K-Love affiliates and sister stations to Air1 affiliate KARO. The Oldies format will move to the 101.5 FM translator and HD2 subchannel of Rhythmic Top 40 KWYD. |
| 19 | The Miami Dolphins switch flagship stations for the 2016 season as it signs a long-term contract with WQAM and WKIS to carry its games after six years with WBGG-FM. This will be the third time that the NFL franchise has associated with the stations, having carried its broadcasts from 1997 to 2004 and from 2007 to 2009. |
| 20 | WZRR: Birmingham is the latest Nash Icon station to drop the format, as it temporarily flipped to hybrid Americana/Country Rock as "99.5 The South." It turned out to be a stunt however; on May 24, WZRR officially flipped to Talk as "Talk 99.5." |
| 25 | iHeartMedia makes another adjustment in its Louisville cluster, as Adult Top 40 WLGX is rebranded as "100.5 Kiss FM". |
| 27 | Rhythmic Hot AC KSSX (San Diego) officially made the transition to Urban-leaning Rhythmic Contemporary, relaunching as "Jam'n 95.7," with an emphasis on Hip-Hop and R&B Hits. This brings the Rhythmic Top 40 format back to San Diego after XHITZ made the transition to Top 40/CHR in February 2014. |
| 27 | Another station owned by Cumulus Media drops the Nash Icon country format, as KRRF (Oxnard/Ventura) flips to Classic Hip-Hop as "Spin 106.3." |
| 30 | For the first time in eight years, NHL Radio is reactivated, as NBC Sports Radio begins carrying the 2016 Stanley Cup Finals on a continent-wide syndication network. |

=== June ===
| Date | Event |
|---|---|
| 5 | NPR photojournalist David Gilkey and his translator Zabihullah Tamanna are killed while covering the War in Afghanistan. |
| 6 | KOSF San Francisco is the latest station in the Bay Area to make changes, as the Classic Hits outlet becomes the first iHeartMedia station to adopt the iHeartRadio branding by shifting to all-1980s' music as "103.7 iHeart 80s Radio." |
| 7 | WTAW-FM (Buffalo, Texas) breaks from its talk radio simulcast of WTAW and begins playing country music. |
| 7 | Rogers rebrands all rock stations to its unified "Rock" branding with the exception of CITI-FM Winnipeg & CHEZ-FM Ottawa as both stations updated their logos to look like its own similar unified branding CIKR-FM (K-Rock 105.7) Kingston is the only rock station owned by Rogers to not switch to that branding. |
| 9 | After six months with Conservative Talk, WWHP (Bloomington, Illinois) flipped to Classic Rock, which came on the heels of the departure of its airstaffers on May 29. |
| 16 | Mount Wilson Broadcasting donates its Salinas/Monterey Classical outlets, KBOQ and KMZT, to the University of Southern California, which plans to convert them to a simulcast of KUSC (Los Angeles). Mount Wilson will retain the call letters and the intellectual property after they are converted to non-commercial status. |
| 16 | WJBX (Fort Myers, Florida) drops ESPN Deportes for News/Talk, and adds a pair of FM simulcasts to cover the area. |
| 20 | The Los Angeles Rams announces that ESPN Radio affiliate KSPN and Classic Rock KSWD will serve as their co-flagship stations, with KSPN designated as the primary station for their pre-and post-games shows. |
| 29 | After nearly 3 years with Sports, only to result in low ratings and no boost from the Detroit Pistons broadcasts, WMGC-FM/Detroit drops the format and begins stunting, landing on Classic Hip-Hop on July 1 as "105.1 The Bounce." |

=== July ===
| Date | Event |
|---|---|
| 1 | KOSO (Modesto, California) drops Adult Top 40 for Country as "Big Dog 92.9," giving the market a new competitor for Cumulus Media's top rated KATM. |
| 1 | Oxnard/Ventura sister stations KOCP and KCAQ swapped frequencies. KCAQ and its Rhythmic format goes from 104.7 to 95.9 and will focus on Ventura County (and takes them out of a battle with Santa Barbara's KVYB), while KOCP and its Rhythmic Oldies format moves from 95.9 to 104.7, allowing them to target the Los Angeles area from the western part of the county with its sister station in Riverside-San Bernardino, KQIE, This radio station has marked the return of its Rhythmic oldies format back to the LA market by covering the eastern portion of the area as well as filling the void left by KHHT's flip to R&B/Hip-Hop (urban contemporary) on February 6, 2015, as KRRL. |
| 1 | Zoo Communications expands its "Revolution" Dance coverage in South Florida with the acquisition of W228BV in Fort Lauderdale (utilizing the HD2 subchannel of Miami's WMIA-FM). The station will drop the Country format after the sale. |
| 2 | Garrison Keillor, after alternating hosting duties for much of the previous season with Chris Thile, hosted his final episode of A Prairie Home Companion, the show he created in 1974. When the show returns on October 15 with Thile as sole host, it will no longer include several of the series' signature old-time radio sketches, such as "News from Lake Wobegon," "Guy Noir, Private Eye" and "Dusty and Lefty, the Lives of the Cowboys." |
| 5 | KRMD-FM (Shreveport-Bossier City) is the latest Cumulus Media Country outlet to drop the Nash FM branding as it reverts to its former branding and reestablish local content. |
| 5 | Adult Top 40 WLTJ (Pittsburgh) goes jockless as it prepares to make changes in its direction and presentation. |
| 9 | CIUR-FM (Winnipeg) ends its seven-year run with Rhythmic Top 40 with a flip to Country. |
| 15 | CFLZ-FM in Fort Erie, Ontario ended its simulcast with CJED-FM in Niagara Falls, Ontario flipping to a variety hits format under the "Juice FM" branding as 101.1 Juice FM. |
| 18 | After stunting for two weeks, former CBS Sports Radio affiliate WJSJ Fernandina Beach/Jacksonville flipped to "DJ 105.3." The station launched with an emphasis on Dance hits from the 1970s, 1980s, and 1990s, but afterwards started adding currents and shifted to Dance-leaning Rhythmic Top 40. The Dance Classics continues to be featured, but are played less frequently. |
| 19 | Beasley Broadcasting acquires Greater Media for $240 million, with the sale being officially completed by October. The deal will give Beasley 73 stations in its portfolio, but because of an overlapping of stations in Charlotte, Beasley will spin off News/Talk WBT-AM -FM and Adult Top 40 WLNK to Entercom to stay within ownership limits. The deal also expands Beasley's reach in Boston and Philadelphia, the latter once again after having sold off WXTU and WRDW-FM to CBS Radio in 2014. |
| 22 | WXYY (Savannah) drops Rhythmic Top 40 for Classic Hip-Hop as "G100.1" |
| 26 | CBS Sports Radio loses another affiliate as the Reno simulcasts of KBZZ & K241AK returned to Talk as "96.1 & 1270 The Buzz." This time around, unlike its previous Conservative direction, KBZZ will offer a Liberal/Progressive presentation. |
| 29 | Three Canadian cities see a changing landscape in the Top 40 format. In Halifax, CJCH-FM rebranded to "Virgin Radio" but retained its Rhythmic Top 40 direction and lineup, while in Kitchener, Ontario, the Virgin radio branding also debuts on CFCA-FM, who also dropped its Hot AC format and began stunting with Christmas music before the official changeover to that branding and Top 40 format. At the same time on the same day in Barrie, Ontario, CIQB-FM dropped its Top 40 format for Classic Rock as "Big 101." |

=== August ===
| Date | Event |
|---|---|
| 1 | Adult Top 40 KVIL (Dallas-Fort Worth) is relaunched with a Top 40/CHR presentation that heavily emphasizing currents as "More Hits 103.7." |
| 1 | Portland, Oregon picked up its second Rhythmic Top 40, as Alpha Media flipped newly acquired Classic Hits KWLZ-FM to the Hip-Hop intensive "WE96.3." |
| 1 | Just a month after the death of its owner, the staff and employees of East Texas Top 40/CHR simulcasts KFRO-FM & KLJT and Regional Mexican sisters KZXM & KMPA were fired and the stations ceased operations, all without warning, by the owner's daughter, who claim she had terminated their services and is in the process of selling the properties on July 29, which the employees say that they never received as they were doing an event during the weekend. The disputes also saw the owner's son, who was the general manager, also fired amid his complaints of health conditions at the facilities. |
| 2 | After briefly considering retirement, Rush Limbaugh comes to terms on a contract extension that will keep The Rush Limbaugh Show on Premiere Networks through the 2020 election. In contrast to the previous eight-year, US$400,000,000 contract, the financial terms of Limbaugh's new contract were not publicly disclosed. A mass carriage agreement with Cumulus Media's 33 Limbaugh affiliates, which was also to expire at the end of 2016, was renewed through 2019 in December. |
| 8 | WVHT (Norfolk) transitions from Top 40/CHR to Adult Top 40, shifting its focus toward battling rival WPTE |
| 12 | After 19 months with Classic Rock, CJKR-FM (Winnipeg) returned to Active Rock and revived its "Power 97" branding. |
| 12 | After two years as a modern rock station, KRNA (Iowa City, Iowa) returned to its previous classic rock format. |
| 15 | The Canadian Broadcasting Corporation announces that Tom Power will succeed Shad as host of the entertainment magazine show Q on CBC Radio One. |
| 17 | 102.7 The Peak CKPK-FM, Vancouver, British Columbia dumps its Triple A/Adult Alternative format as it flips to Modern Rock. |
| 18 | After seven years with a Dance/EDM format, KYLI (Las Vegas) was sold to the Farmworker Educational Association, who announced that the station will flip formats to Regional Mexican after the sale closes. The Dance format will move to online only with listeners being directed to the Pulse 87 website. |
| 25 | The Golden State Warriors announced that it has signed a long-term deal with KGMZ starting with the team's 2016–17 season, ending KNBR's 32-year run as the Bay Area's flagship station for the Oakland-based NBA franchise. |
| 26 | The Active Rock format returns to Ottawa after two years, as CIDG-FM drops Blues/Classic Rock to become "101.7 The Rebel." The flip will also coincide with a change in frequency from 101.9 to 101.7, which in turn paves the way for French AC CHIP-FM in Fort-Coulonge, Quebec to shift to the 101.9 signal as part of an arrangement between its owners. The Blues format will continue as an Internet radio station. |
| 29 | After two years with Country, KQCS (Quad Cities) begins stunting towards a format flip to Classic Hits as "KIIK 104.9" on August 31. The flip comes amidst another flip in the market as rimshot Classic Hits WYEC announced plans to switch to Jack FM on September 1. |
| 29 | Blair Garner announces he will leave "America's Morning Show" to return to the overnight time slot he hosted from 1993 to 2013. Nash FM will continue to carry both the morning show (with Ty Bentley taking over) and the overnight show, which will move Kix Brooks to another position in the network. |

=== September ===
| Date | Event |
|---|---|
| 1 | CKJN-FM, Haldimand, Ontario dumps its country music format as it rebrands to "92.9 The Grand" returning the oldies/classic hits format to the Hamilton market after CKOC switched from oldies to sports talk last fall. In addition, the station took on its new call letters "CHTG-FM". |
| 2 | Casper picks up its second Top 40/CHR, as KMXW drops Country to become "Max 92.5." The flip gives the market's 36-year veteran KTRS-FM its first serious competition in that station's history. |
| 2 | At 9:39 a.m. (HST), nearly six years to the day after the launch of Rhythmic AC "93.9 Jamz", KHJZ (Honolulu) flipped back to rhythmic contemporary, this time branded as "93.9 The Beat." The flip brings the market back to having three Rhythmic Top 40s, reigniting a battle with KDDB and KPHW. On September 9, the call letters were changed to KUBT, while the Rhythmic AC format replaced the Evolution Dance/EDM format on its HD2 and FM translator, this time emphasizing Classic Hip-Hop tracks (coinciding with the sudden flip of KORL-HD3 to 80s Music as "Retro 97.1"), allowing KUBT to incorporate Dance crossovers onto the playlist. |
| 2 | Rogers' CFRV-FM Lethbridge, Alberta rebrands from "107.7 The River" to "Kiss 107.7", becoming the latest Rogers station to adopt the "Kiss" branding. The station's format remains Hot AC. |
| 4 | KZZA 106.7 FM in Muenster, Texas rebrands from "La Bonita" to "La Ranchera" while retaining its Regional Mexican format. |
| 4 | KZMP 1540 AM in University Park, Texas drops its ESPN Deportes Radio programming to simulcast KZZA "La Ranchera 106.7", leaving the Dallas/Fort Worth market without an ESPN Deportes affiliation. |
| 9 | Entercom and Pegula Sports and Entertainment secure a five-year contract extension that will keep the Buffalo Bills Radio Network and Sabres Hockey Network broadcasts on flagship station WGR and other Entercom stations in upstate New York through the spring of 2021. |
| 9 | KTRR (Fort Collins, Colorado) abruptly drops their Adult Contemporary format for classic hits billed as the new sound of tri 102.5. |
| 12 | After 17 years of Rhythmic Top 40, WXIS (covering the Tri-Cities region of Johnson City/Kingsport/Elizabethton/Bristol in Tennessee and Bristol in Virginia) began stunting towards a new format. On September 26, WXIS flipped to All News. |
| 16 | Peoria is the latest market to pick up a Classic Hip-Hop outlet, as WNGY jettisoned its struggling Top 40/CHR direction after a year to become "G102.3." |
| 16 | John R. Gambling retires (again) from radio. Assuming he does not return (he has retired at least once before), it will finally bring an end to a near-continuous run of morning shows hosted by Gambling, his father or his grandfather that had aired in the New York metropolitan area since 1925. |
| 16 | Acadia Broadcasting closed its acquisition on CJLS-FM in Yarmouth, Nova Scotia as it rebrands the station from The Wave to Y95. The station's music format remains AC. |
| 22 | CFTX-FM 96.5 FM in Ottawa-Gatineau dumps its mainstream rock format and its "Capitale Rock" moniker and flips to classic hits as "Pop 96.5". |
| 26 | iHeartMedia doubles the Conservative Talk content in Tucson, as it flips Spanish adult hits KTZR to "The Talk of Tucson." The station will share some of its programming with sister KNST, including Glenn Beck's broadcasts, with KTZR airing it in mornings live while KNST will air it on delay in afternoons. |
| 26 | Two of Radio One's Philadelphia outlets, Gospel WPPZ-FM and Classic Hip-Hop WPHI-FM, trade places on the FM dial in an effort to improve their ratings. WPPZ-FM will rebrand as "Praise 107.9" while WPHI-FM adopts the "Boom 103.9" moniker. With the change, WPHI would shift to urban contemporary, with a Hot AC-type presentation that continues to feature R&B/Hip-Hop recurrents. On October 6, their Urban Oldies sister WRNB transitioned back to Urban AC with more emphasis on currents and less focus on gold and recurrents. |
| 26 | Las Vegas' Top 40 war sees yet another casualty, as KPLV flips to Variety Hits as "93.1 The Mountain." |
| 30 | Entercom spins off WQXI/Atlanta, which had been simulcasting Adult Top 40 sister WSTR, to Atlanta Radio Korea for $850,000. The station is expected to flip an Asian-language format after the sale closes |
| 30 | Just seven years after it flipped formats, KMJM-FM (100.3 FM)/St. Louis returned to R&B/Hip-Hop, as it becomes the second station to drop the Classic Hip-Hop direction this month. This move paved the way for Rhythmic Top 40 sister KBWX to flip formats to Alternative on October 18 (and changed call letters to KLLT on October 25). |

=== October ===
| Date | Event |
|---|---|
| 1 | KCAX Branson, Missouri begins stunting with Christmas music, the first station in the nation to begin playing it for the 2016 holiday season. |
| 3 | Just one day after dropping its Country format due to low ratings, WUBG (Indianapolis) flipped to R&B/Hip-Hop with the new calls WZRL and adopted the "Real 98.3" branding. |
| 3 | After posting its lowest ratings since its rebranding in December 2015, KAGM Santa Fe/Albuquerque is the latest station to drop the Rhythmic Top 40 format, as it flipped to Modern Adult Contemporary as "106.7 The River." |
| 11 | South Bend picks up its third Top 40, as Mid-West Family Broadcasting Country WHFB-FM ends its stunting of TV theme songs to become "Live 99.9," and adopts the new call letters WQLQ. Using a Rhythmic-leaning direction, they'll face competition from the broader based WNDV-FM and Rhythmic WSMK. |
| 12 | The Terre Haute, Indiana radio market will see one company exiting and two expanding, as Emmis spins off Country WTHI-FM and the intellectual property of WWVR to Midwest Communications, and Top 40/CHR WFNB, the license of WWVR, and Sports WFNF to DLC Media, who in turn will acquire Classic Country WDKE from Midwest to keep within FCC ownership limits. |
| 28 | Spokane picks up its second Classic Rocker, as KYOZ, the former Religious simulcast and sister station of KMBI-FM, is launched as "Oz 95.7," utilizing an FM translator due to the AM being a daytimer. The station will challenge iHeartMedia's KKZX, the top rated station in the Spokane market, for listeners. |
| 28 | CHQX-FM in Prince Albert, Saskatchewan rebrands from Mix 101 to 101.5 XFM continuing as an active rock station. |

=== November ===
| Date | Event |
|---|---|
| 1 | In Atlanta, R&B/Hip-Hop WSTR-HD3 drops The Breakfast Club in favor of a local show hosted by Yung Joc and midday host Mo Quick. The move also paved the way for Atlanta to pick up a fourth R&B/Hip-Hop competitor on November 11, as iHeartMedia's Spanish AC WWPW-HD3 & Alternative simulcast WRDG make the flip, becoming "92.3/96.7 The Beat," serving as the new home for the Premiere Networks-produced program. |
| 7 | Newcap's Real Country network launches as the company rebrands all FM country stations in Alberta to the Real Country branding |
| 9 | iHeartMedia's Liberal Talker WXXM-FM/Madison drops the format and stunts with Christmas Music. The change comes the morning after Donald Trump, a Republican, defeated Democrat Hillary Clinton in the 2016 Presidential election; Trump won Wisconsin in the race, the first Republican to do so since the Ronald Reagan landslide of 1984. On November 23, the station ends the stunting and debuts "Rewind 92.1," giving the Wisconsin State Capitol its second Classic Hits outlet as it takes on rival WOLX-FM, which was about to go into its annual Christmas music launch hours before WXXM's surprise flip. |
| 9 | Morning show hosts Vickie Shae and Sean Dilworth were let go from CJGV-FM Winnipeg, leaving the station jockless and dropping the Modern AC format in favor of airing Christmas music, which lasted until December 25, when it flipped to an Upbeat-leaning AC billed as "Peggy 99.1" (a reference to Winnipeg's numerous nicknames) |
| 9 | After 10 years using the Movin' franchise (one of the brand's longest-running stations), WMVN Syracuse shifts from Rhythmic AC to Rhythmic Top 40 under the new brand "96.5/100.3 The Beat," giving Central New York a new competitor for Top 40/CHR rivals WNTQ and WWHT-FM. The station also serves as a part the Utica-Rome area. |
| 16 | At 3 p.m., after playing "Out of My League" by Fitz and the Tantrums, KDGE Dallas-Ft. Worth dropped the alternative format after 27 years and began stunting with a loop of "Closing Time" by Semisonic, while redirecting listeners to Active Rock sister KEGL. At 5 p.m. the next day, KDGE shifts to AC as "Star 102.1", launching with Christmas and Holiday songs like Last Christmas by Wham!, before starting a new Adult Contemporary format on December 26 with Madonna's Lucky Star. |
| 17 | Radio One pulls another station out of the Urban Oldies format, as WFUN-FM St. Louis rebranded as "95.5: R&B and Old School for the Lou", and shifted back to Urban AC. |
| 21 | Columbus, Ohio picks up a second Sports format on the FM dial, as iHeartMedia pulls the plug on Alternative WXZX to launch "105.7 The Zone," which will utilize Fox Sports Radio programming. |
| 21 | Just two days after Kanye West cuts short, and after 30 minutes, abruptly ends, a concert performance at Sacramento's Golden 1 Center (which would be his final stop on his Saint Pablo Tour as he would cancel it before checking into a facility for medical treatment), the market's Rhythmic Top 40 outlet, KHHM, announced that they were done with playing West's songs for good as its morning show made that statement by retaliating with cutting off his single "Fade" before PD/Airstaffer Justin "JayMarzz" Marshall slammed the rapper for criticizing the fans, fellow musicians, and bias towards radio not supporting him. |
| 28 | Billings picks up its first Rhythmic Top 40, as KYLW and K238CP returned to the air as "Wild 104.5", adding to a crowded Top 40/CHR race as it takes on KKBR, KRSQ, and KPLN. |

=== December ===
| Date | Event |
|---|---|
| 1 | Classic Country WUSY-HD2 Chattanooga Flips to R&B/Hip-Hop as Real 96.1. This will be the second time around for the FM translator, as it takes on rival WJTT. |
| 5 | After nearly 20 years with Spanish Top 40, the Los Angeles area trimulcasts of KSSE/KSSC/KSSD flips to Spanish Adult Hits, billed as "La Suavecita." |
| 5 | ESPN Radio affiliate WJLT Evansville, Indiana flips to AC as "My 105.3," giving the market a new competitor for the top-rated WIKY-FM. |
| 6 | Educational Media Foundation expands its portfolio with the purchase of WETN Wheaton, Illinois from Wheaton College in a leasing deal to cover the suburban Chicago area as an Air 1 satellite, and the acquisition of Country simulcasts WLFV & WARV-FM Richmond from Alpha Media, which will become K-LOVE affiliates after the sale. |
| 9 | Actress/radio personality Susan Olsen is fired from online radio station LA Talk Radio after a dispute with a commenter on Facebook coming from Leon Acord-Whiting, an openly gay actor and podcaster, over her Conservative views during her radio program "Two Chicks Talking Politics" (with Liberal co-host Sheena Metal) by sending a private message to Acord-Whiting that included using homophobic comments that immediately goes public from the latter. |
| 12 | After nearly two years with Rock, only to post low numbers and controversy over ratings diaries that resulted in morning host Bubba the Love Sponge facing an upcoming court case against Nielsen Audio in May 2017, WBRN-FM Tampa dropped the format and began stunting with Christmas music until a new format is announced. |
| 25 | Alpha Media's San Jose AC outlet KBAY will become the latest station in the San Francisco Bay Area to flip formats, as it fills the Classic Hits void that was vacated by San Francisco's KOSF earlier this year when the latter flipped to All-80s. |
| 26 | KDGE in Dallas officially launches its AC format under the "Star 102.1" branding. The switch brings the format back to the Dallas-Fort Worth area, two years, after long-time AC station KVIL dropped the format for Hot AC. |
| 30 | After nearly nine years as a Top 40/CHR, KKHH Houston flipped to Adult Hits as "95.7 The Spot" |

== Debuts ==
| Date | Event |
|---|---|
| February 5 | Just eight years after it left the air due to economic conditions, KBDS Taft/Bakersfield, California returns to the air with its Rhythmic Contemporary format, this time branding itself as "103.9 The Beat," and adding to an increasing Top 40 war as they face Rhythmic rival KISV and Mainstream rivals KKXX-FM and KLLY. |
| March 21 | The Maryland Transit Administration becomes the first transit agency in the United States to operate a low-power radio station with the launch of WTTZ-LP in Baltimore, which carries traffic information during rush hours and smooth jazz at other hours on 93.5 FM. |
| May 26 | WFOV-LP, a locally owned and operated low power station in Flint, Michigan, signs on at 92.1 FM, with a mix of adult hits music, talk shows, and local public affairs programming. |
| July 2 | Pop EDM, a live 4-hour Dance program hosted by Vic Latino and broadcasting from Las Vegas, will debut in syndication via ABC Radio Networks. This marks ABC's first return to long-form programming since selling its previous library to Citadel Broadcasting in 2007. |
| December 1 | Radio gradska mreža - Mostarski radio is launched in Bosnia by Javna ustanova Centar za kulturu Mostar. |

== Closings ==
| Date | Event |
|---|---|
| January 31 | Live365 officially ceases operations on this date due to the increased fees placed into effect by the Copyright Royalty Board and the expiration of the Webcasters Settlement Act of 2009, which saw its investors withdraw their stake in the internet broadcaster. |
| February 13 | After 12 years, Sirius XM discontinues the LGBT-focused channel OutQ on this date, with online streaming ending on February 18. The move also leaves most of its lineup (Michael Musto, Lance Bass, Frank DeCaro, and Keith Price) displaced, although Larry Flick will stay at Sirius XM as part of Entertainment Weekly radio and Studio 54 Radio. |
| March 11 | After 36 years as an air staffer and programmer, Norm Winer leaves Adult Alternative WXRT/Chicago to pursue other opportunities. |
| March 23 | After 36 years as a fixture on Toledo radio (at WSPD, WKKO, and WRVF), citing a planned retirement with her husband, and battling non-Hodgkin's lymphoma, Mary Beth Zolik broadcasts her last morning program as part of Mary Beth & Rick on WRVF. |
| March 30 | After 12 years broadcasting a Christian AC format across the state of Florida via 24 translators and 4 HD2 sub channels, Calvary Chapel of Ft. Lauderdale closes operations of Reach-FM, which was based at flagship station WREH. The ministries will leave the programming automated until WREH and the properties are sold off. |
| March 31 | William Bennett, host of Salem Radio Network's national morning show Morning in America for the past decade, retires from radio, with Salem hiring Larry Elder to replace Bennett in a three-way move that will see Hugh Hewitt's show moved into Bennett's time slot and Elder returning to his previous West Coast afternoon drive time slot that he previously hosted for ABC. |
| April 21 | After a nine-year run, Radio One cancels Yolanda Adams' syndicated morning show after the company decides not to renew the Grammy Award-winning Gospel singer's contract. |
| April 28 | After a 32-year run on radio, Drew Pinsky announces that Loveline would air its final broadcast on this date. Pinsky and co-host Mike Catherwood will continue to be heard on a local daytime show on KABC, with Matt Pinfield replacing Loveline in syndication. |
| May 14 | Definitely Not the Opera airs its final original episode on CBC Radio One. DNTO, which had aired on the network since 1994 and was hosted by Sook-Yin Lee since 2002, was a Saturday afternoon mix of music, pop culture, interviews, and storytelling features. |
| June 25 | Whad'Ya Know? aired its final live broadcast. Distributed by Public Radio International, the Saturday morning comedy/interview/quiz program has been hosted by Michael Feldman and produced by Wisconsin Public Radio since its launch in 1985. |
| August 14 | CKSL London, Ontario permanently signs off due to transmitter disrepair. |
| September 25 | After 61 years on the air (62 if it had made it to October), Cumulus Media officially signs off its Toledo Talk outlet WTOD and moved its programming to the FM translator and HD2 subchannel of WQQO, replacing the Alternative format. The WTOD calls will relocate to Sports sister WLQR-FM. |
| December 10 | In concurrent moves, Herman Cain and Jonathon Brandmeier are both canceled from the WestwoodOne talk lineup. Cain's show will continue as a local program on WSB and WSBB, reduced to two hours, and continue to be syndicated on a more limited basis by Cox Radio. |
| December 13 | Tulip Radio, a community radio station in Spalding, Lincolnshire, UK, ceases broadcasting. |
| December 16 | After a 12-year run, and just two weeks before its announcement to flip from AC to Classic Hits on Christmas Day, KBAY/San Jose's morning team of Sam Van Zandt and Lissa Kreisler air their final broadcast. The move also ends Van Zandt's 52-year career in radio and Kreisler's 29-year stint as an air staffer at KBAY. |
| December 19 | Evolution Beatport Show with Pete Tong ended its run after 3 1/2 years |
| December 23 | The Diane Rehm Show airs its last live broadcast. |
| December TBA | After 23 years, WTMJ Milwaukee host Charlie Sykes has announced that he retiring at the end of the year and plans to concentrate on his Conservative website RightWisconsin.com |

== Deaths ==
- January 5: Pierre Boulez, 90, conductor, composer and broadcaster
- January 17
  - Kris Kelly, 45, American radio personality and programmer in the R&B/Hip-Hop and Top 40/CHR genres.
  - Ramblin' Lou Schriver, 86, American Country music performer (Grand Ole Opry, WWVA Jamboree), radio personality (WJJL Niagara Falls, New York and WWOL Lackawanna, New York) and longtime owner-operator of WXRL/1300: Lancaster, New York from 1970 to his death.
  - Velia Taneff, 86, American air personality at WLTH Gary, Indiana.
- January 28: Buddy Cianci, 74, American politician and broadcaster from Providence, Rhode Island.
- January 31: Terry Wogan, 77, Irish-British broadcaster.
- February 2: Bob Elliott, 92. Longtime, US radio comedian and half of the comedy team of Bob and Ray.
- February 8: Alejandro Nieto Molina, 48, SVP and GM/Radio for Univision Radio and radio executive/programming alumni for Spain's Cadena Ser, Groupo Prisa US, and Caracol.
- February 20: Ove Verner Hansen, 83, Danish opera singer and actor who began his career with the Danish National Radio Choir
- February 24: Eddie Einhorn, 80, presenter of the first nationwide radio and television broadcasts of college basketball in the United States.
- February 29: Charlie Tuna, 71, US radio personality most recently known as a syndicated classic hits jockey.
- March 23:
  - Jim Roselle, 89, US radio personality (61 years at WJTN Jamestown, New York).
  - Joe Garagiola, 90, American baseball player turned commentator (radio work included the St. Louis Cardinals Radio Network, MLB on NBC Radio and the New York Yankees Radio Network).
- March 27: Mother Angelica, 92, US Catholic nun and founder of WEWN Vandiver/Irondale, Alabama.
- April 9: Stacy Fawcett, 45, US radio and television personality in the Dallas-Ft. Worth media market, working as an air personality at KVIL-FM.
- April 11: Doug Banks, 57, American syndicated radio host whose The Doug Banks Show had aired nationwide since 1997.
- April 14: Rod Reyes, 80, Filipino radio executive, former vice president and general manager of GMA Radio Television Arts
- April 19: Denise Stewart-Bohn, US air personality at WCXT (Benton Harbor, Michigan)
- May 1: Sydney Onayemi, 78, Nigerian-born Swedish DJ
- May 25: Sherry-Ruth Francis, 52, US air personality at KRHN (Kerrville, Texas)
- June 1: Lacy Neff, 49, US on-air personality at WVAQ (Morgantown, West Virginia). Winner of the National Association of Broadcasters' Marconi Award for Small Market Personality Of The Year twice, first in 2006 and again in 2009.
- June 5: David Gilkey, US NPR photojournalist and Zabihullah Tamanna (Gilkey's translator)
- June 12: Janet Waldo, 96, US radio, television and voice actress best known in radio for the title role in Meet Corliss Archer, among other various guest spots.
- June 23: Ralph Stanley, 89, US bluegrass music pioneer whose radio career included 12 years at WCYB (Bristol, Virginia) and membership in the Grand Ole Opry.
- June 26: Donna Kelley, 66, US news anchor on KARN-FM (Little Rock).
- July 4: Rod Hansen, 75. Multiple award-winning investigative reporter on WJR/760 (Detroit) from 1967 to 2005.
- July 28: Jerry Doyle, 60. Actor turned radio host, heard on Talk Radio Network from the mid-2000s until his death.
- August 16: Dennis Alvord, 68. Radio personality, an alumnus of KPWR/Los Angeles and KTFM/San Antonio, known on air as "Joe Nasty"
- August 19: Horacio Salgán, 100, Argentine tango musician
- August 27: Joy Browne, 71. Psychologist whose radio program had been on air since 1978 and aired nationwide since the early 1990s.
- September 8: Eric Von Broadley, 58. Television and radio journalist, personality, and publisher in the Milwaukee media market, an alumnus of WMCS, WAWA and WNOV.
- September 9: Bill Nojay, 59. Republican politician, attorney and syndicated radio host (show originated from WYSL Avon, New York).
- September 11: "Crazy" Eddie Antar, 68. Electronics retailer infamous for his ubiquitous radio and television advertisements.
- September 16: Tom Torbjornsen, 60, host of America's Car Show.
- September 26: Ioan Gyuri Pascu, 55, Romanian singer, manager, producer and actor, originally discovered by Radio Vacanţa
- September 30: Oscar Brand, 96, Canadian folk singer-songwriter and broadcaster
- October 20: Mieke Telkamp, 82, Dutch singer
- October 22: Herb Kent, 88, US radio host, WVAZ-FM, WVON.
- November 4: Jean-Jacques Perrey, 87, French electronic music producer and broadcaster
- November 29: Allan Zavod, 71, Australian composer, many of whose works were premiered on radio
- December 2: Chelsea Dolan, 27, US DJ/musician who also did an airshift at KALX Berkeley-San Francisco.
- December 12: Tom Moffatt, 85, US television/radio personality and concert promoter who was as a fixture in the Honolulu media market as a DJ at KHVH, KPOA, KPOI, and, until his death, KKOL-FM.
- December 17: Bob Coburn, 68, US radio personality at KLOS Los Angeles and host of Rockline
- December 18: Bill Florian, 84, Founder and original owner of WNIB (now WDRV) Chicago from 1955 to 1997.
