= Mass media in Honolulu =

This article concerns media in Honolulu, Hawaii.

== Newspapers ==
Honolulu is served by one daily newspaper, the Honolulu Star-Advertiser. The newspaper began publication on June 7, 2010, following the merger of the city's two daily newspapers, the Honolulu Advertiser and the Honolulu Star-Bulletin. Prior to the merger, Honolulu had been one of the few cities of its size in the U.S. to have more than one daily newspaper.

There is also "MidWeek", a weekly newspaper which is published every Wednesday by O'ahu Publications Inc., and distributed free on O'ahu.

== Magazines ==
Honolulu has the longest established magazine west of the Mississippi, Honolulu Magazine.

== Television ==
=== Full-power ===
- 2 KHON-TV Honolulu (Fox, The CW on 2.2)
- 4 KITV Honolulu (ABC)
- 5 KGMB Honolulu (CBS)
- 9 KHII-TV Honolulu (Independent with MyNetworkTV)
- 11 KHET Honolulu (PBS)
- 13 KHNL Honolulu (NBC, Independent on 13.2, Telemundo on 13.6)
- 14 KWHE Honolulu (Religious independent)
- 15 KKAI Kailua (Various)
- 20 KIKU Honolulu (Multicultural independent)
- 26 KAAH-TV Honolulu (TBN)**
- 32 KBFD-DT Honolulu (Asian independent)
- 38 KALO Honolulu (Religious independent)
- 44 KWBN Honolulu (Daystar)**
- 50 KUPU Waimānalo (Various)
- 66 KPXO-TV Kāneʻohe (Ion Television)

==== Early conversion to DT ====
On January 15, 2009, Hawaii became the first state in the United States to have its television stations switch from analog to digital early. As a result of this move, all of Honolulu's full-power TV stations, including network affiliates and independent stations, ceased analog broadcasting at noon on that date. By making the switch early, the broadcast towers atop Haleakala near the birds' nesting grounds can be dismantled without interfering with the petrels' nesting season. Also, as a result of the conversion, the former NTSC channels listed in this table are now the same channels that can be seen on a PSIP Virtual channel.

=== Low-power ===
- 42 K42CO
- 48 KHHI-LP (HSN)
- 64 K64FN

== Radio stations ==
=== AM ===
- 590 KSSK Honolulu (Adult contemporary-KSSK-FM simulcast)
- 690 KHNR Honolulu (Conservative talk)
- 760 KGU Honolulu (Sports/VSiN)
- 830 KHVH Honolulu (Talk radio)
- 870 KHCM Honolulu (Chinese)
- 990 KIKI Honolulu (Sports/FSR)
- 1030 KLHT Honolulu (Christian radio)
- 1130 KPHI Honolulu (Hawaiian oldies)
- 1210 KZOO Honolulu (J-pop)
- 1270 KNDI Honolulu (Silent)
- 1370 KHXM Pearl City (Alternative rock)
- 1420 KKEA Honolulu (Sports/ESPN)
- 1500 KHKA Honolulu (Sports/WW1)

=== FM ===
- 88.1 KHPR Honolulu (HPR-1-NPR/talk/jazz)
- 89.3 KIPO Honolulu (HPR-2-classical music)
- 90.1 KTUH Honolulu (College/free-form/modern rock/University of Hawaiʻi)
- 91.5 KLHT-FM Honolulu (Contemporary worship/Christian)
- 92.3 KSSK-FM Honolulu (Adult contemporary)
- 93.1 KQMQ-FM Honolulu (Hawaiian contemporary/reggae)
- 93.9 KUBT Honolulu (Rhythmic contemporary)
- 94.7 KUMU-FM Honolulu (Rhythmic adult contemporary)
- 95.5 KAIM-FM Honolulu (Air1)
- 96.3 KRTR-FM Honolulu (Hot adult contemporary)
- 97.5 KHCM-FM Honolulu (Country)
- 98.5 KDNN Honolulu (Hawaiian contemporary)
- 99.5 KGU-FM Honolulu (Christian)
- 100.3 KCCN-FM Honolulu (Hawaiian contemporary)
- 101.1 KORL-FM Waiʻanae (Classic rock and hits)
- 101.9 KUCD Honolulu (K-pop/Top 40)
- 102.7 KDDB Waipahu (Contemporary hit radio)
- 103.5 KLUU Wahiawā (K-Love)
- 104.3 KPHW Kāneʻohe (Rhythmic Top 40)
- 105.1 KINE-FM Honolulu (Hawaiian adult contemporary)
- 105.9 KPOI-FM Honolulu (Soft AC)
- 106.7 KNAN Nānākuli (Rhythmic AC)
- 107.9 KKOL-FM ʻAiea (Classic hits)

==== Low-powered FM ====
- 91.1 K216FI (Christian Contemporary)
- 95.9 KXRG-LP (Dance)
- 104.7 K284AL (Community programming)

== Cable and satellite television ==
Oceanic Spectrum (a division of Charter Spectrum) is the primary cable television carrier in the Honolulu metropolitan area. However, in June 2011, Hawaiian Telcom, the state's main telephone carrier, was given a license to start providing cable services in Hawaii, which is expected to begin in early 2012 in Honolulu County before going statewide. Satellite television (DIRECTV, Dish Network, some C-Band) is also available as an alternative.

== Satellite radio ==
Prior to 2011, due to its geographical location, service from Sirius XM Radio (the parent company of Sirius Satellite Radio and XM Satellite Radio) was not reachable, although Sirius XM programming could've been reached through other outlets via internet or through subscription from various phone providers. XM programming was featured on DIRECTV channels in Honolulu, but DIRECTV dropped the lineup in February 2010 in favor of Sonic Tap.

That all changed in 2011, when Sirius XM received approval from the FCC to begin transmission to Hawaii and Alaska as it prepares to place a 1.8Kw transmitter in downtown Honolulu in anticipation for a future launch. Sirius XM had been trying to expand service into Hawaii since 2007 but had opposition from the Hawaii Association of Broadcasters fearing loss of local competition. The FCC rejected the HAB's petition.
