= Eileen Anderson =

American politician (1928–2021)

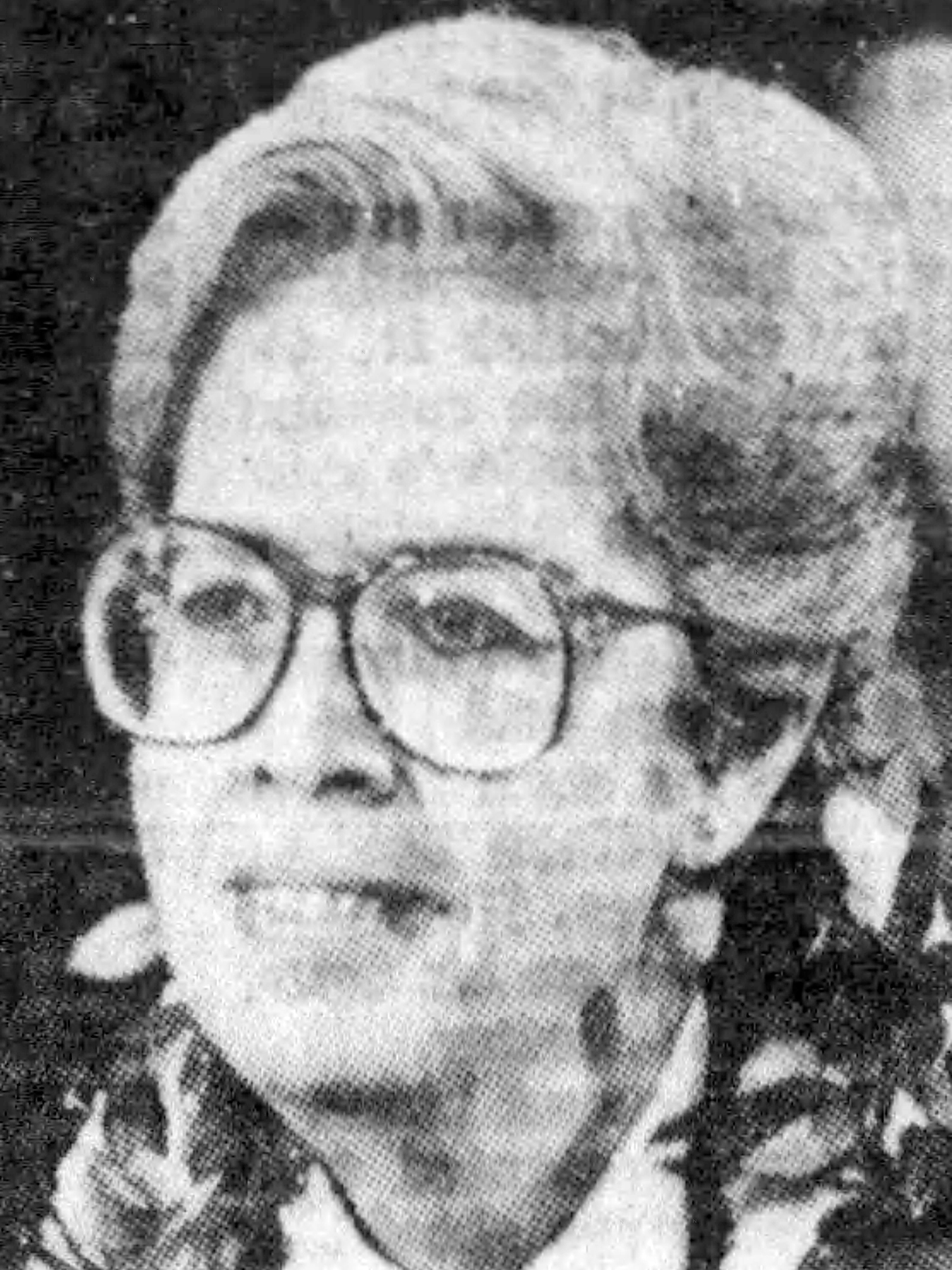

10th Mayor of Honolulu
- In office January 2, 1981 – January 2, 1985
- Preceded by: Frank Fasi
- Succeeded by: Frank Fasi

Personal details
- Born: October 18, 1928 Bell, California, U.S.
- Died: November 3, 2021 (aged 93)
- Party: Democratic
- Spouse(s): Major Clifford F. Anderson, Honolulu Police Department

Eileen Anderson (October 18, 1928 – November 3, 2021) was an American politician who served as Mayor of Honolulu, Hawaii from 1981 to 1985. She was the first, and as of 2025, the only woman to hold the office. A Democrat, Anderson served in various positions in the city and county and the state. She was the first Hawaii State Director of Budget and Finance.

== Early life ==
Anderson attended the University of California in Los Angeles and, after moving to Hawaii with her family, graduated from the University of Hawaii at Manoa in 1950 with a bachelor's degree in psychology. Anderson married Clifford F. Anderson, a retired Honolulu Police Department major. She and her husband raised three children. After working for Hawaiian Telephone Company, the predecessor of the present-day Hawaiian Telcom, Anderson began public service in various state agencies. She found herself as the state's first budget and finance director under Governor George Ariyoshi.

== Mayor of Honolulu ==
In 1980, Anderson defeated popular incumbent Frank Fasi with seventy percent of the vote. With the unpredicted surprise landslide victory against Fasi and his notoriously powerful machine, that year Anderson was named Hawaii Business Magazine "Woman of the Year 1980". Anderson served a single term at Honolulu Hale, taking office on January 2, 1981 and leaving office in 1985. Anderson's tenure as mayor was highlighted by her promise to continue development of the island of Oahu but with fiscal responsibility.

Anderson was a member of the United States Conference of Mayors, an organization of mayors of United States cities with populations of 30,000 people or more.

=== Cabinet ===
Prominent members of Anderson's administration included Bob Awana as administrative director and chief of staff, later chief of staff to Linda Lingle, the first Hawaii Republican governor after forty years of Democratic dominance in the state. Awana helped run Anderson's failed re-election campaign against Fasi. Anderson appointed Andy Chang as managing director of Honolulu. Chang would continue to serve the city and county in various capacities after Anderson's departure from office.

=== Honolulu Area Rail Rapid Transit ===
Anderson's vow of fiscal responsibility was maintained in her cancellation of the Honolulu Area Rail Rapid Transit project, which was planned in the 1970s and close to construction approval. Popularly known as HART, the project in its original form would have built a heavy rail system with twenty-three miles of track featuring twenty-one stations from Pearl City in central Oahu to Hawaii Kai in East Oahu.

In addition to millions to be invested by the city and county, millions of dollars in grants earmarked for HART were returned by Anderson. She declined US$5.75 million from the Federal government of the United States saying, "Why spend five million dollars on a system that won't be built?"

Achieving national attention, Anderson defended her position by arguing the long-term costs to taxpayers for such an expensive project, especially after U.S. President Ronald Reagan announced elimination of Federal public transit funding in the country and the ongoing need for more funding for Interstate H-3 construction. She rather argued in favor of smaller, incremental improvements to the bus system.

With growing development leading to increased traffic congestion on Oahu, the city and county continued to make public transit a focus of public debate during Anderson and Fasi's tenures. On October 6, 1981, Anderson announced she hoped to study the San Diego Trolley, a system funded with gas taxes.

Both Anderson and Fasi continued to modernize TheBus but a rail system was never approved. It wasn't until the 2000s that Honolulu agreed to a similar, more expensive project under the leadership of the mayor, Mufi Hannemann.

=== Political defeats ===
Anderson once again stood for election as mayor and was defeated by Fasi, who had switched his political affiliation from Democrat to Republican, so as to avoid being knocked out of the Democratic primary by Anderson. Anderson subsequently sought a political comeback by seeking the nomination of her party for lieutenant governor in 1986. Anderson lost the primary election to state senator Ben Cayetano, who later served alongside Hawaii Governor John Waihee before becoming governor himself.

== Popular culture ==
=== Perry and Price ===
In 1983, KSSK-FM reformatted its morning programming pairing Michael W. Perry and Larry Price, who became two of the most popular personalities and one of the most popular radio news programs in Hawaii. Anderson was a regular listener and, a sign of Perry and Price's growing influence, was the first major person to call the show during the broadcast, in effect signaling how relevant they were to local culture and politics.

Anderson called the radio hosts, angry about their comments over a political issue. The Honolulu Star-Bulletin published the account on August 27, 1998:

It was a woman who said she was Mayor Eileen Anderson and she had to call immediately because she was so mad and she still had toothpaste in her mouth," Perry said. "I said, 'Oh baloney, you're not the mayor,' and hung up on her." A few minutes later, Anderson called back, sans toothpaste. "Wow, you really are the mayor," Price remembered saying. "And you're listening to us! Hey Michael, the mayor listens to our show. Do you believe that!

Since Anderson's initial call, every Mayor of Honolulu and Governor of Hawaii has appeared on the morning Perry and Price program via telephone to comment or discuss various cultural and political issues and current events.

== Women in politics ==
Interested in her role as first woman to become Mayor of Honolulu, the Hawaii Kai Sun Press asked Anderson to comment on women in politics. Published on June 1, 1983, Anderson said, "There is no way that we're going to change some of the discriminatory activities that go on toward women unless we do get them involved".

== Notes ==
Preceded by Frank Fasi	Mayor of Honolulu; 1981 - 1985	Succeeded by Frank Fasi
