= Earl McDaniel (DJ) =

American actor (1928–2014)

Earl McDaniel (August 24, 1928 – March 26, 2014) was an American disc jockey, actor, promoter, talent manager, and radio executive.

McDaniel's career as a disc jockey in Los Angeles in the early days of rock 'n' roll led to his involvement with many aspects of the entertainment industry. He hosted the first dance/hop show on Los Angeles television; managed the band The Champs in 1961-1962; and acted in at least two movies.

His work later transitioned to management roles, where he served as program director and general manager for numerous radio stations. He spent much of his later career as president of Heftel Broadcasting, owned by former Hawaii congressman Cecil Heftel.

== Early life ==
McDaniel was born in Santa Monica, California. At age 18 he enlisted in the US Army. He was stationed in postwar Japan, where he began his broadcast career with the American Forces Radio and Television Network.

== Career ==
After his military service, McDaniel worked as a disc jockey for several Los Angeles-area radio stations: At KFVD/KPOP from 1953–58, KLAC in 1958, and KDAY from 1958-61. At KFVD/KPOP he worked with fellow deejays Hunter Hancock and Art Laboe. McDaniel hosted the morning drive show, where his "record of the week" and "sleeper of the week" segments were new to music shows. To stay on the cutting edge of the emerging rock 'n' roll scene, McDaniel would visit record stores and juke box operators to find out what was becoming popular, and use that to determine what music he would play on the air.

In 1956 McDaniel became the first disc jockey to play Elvis Presley's "Heartbreak Hotel" in heavy rotation. In recognition of this, RCA invited McDaniel to Las Vegas in April 1956 to publicly present Presley with his first gold record on stage. This event catapulted McDaniel to national recognition and established him as one of the radio giants of 1950s. McDaniel was also the first to play The Chipmunks' "The Chipmunk Song" on the air, spinning it twice an hour on a Thanksgiving weekend. When the station owner heard the song, he called McDaniel and threatened to fire him if he played the song one more time. McDaniel promptly did, and was fired. But the song had already been heard by thousands, and by the end of the weekend it had become the #1 selling album at Wallichs Music City, and McDaniel was re-hired.

Throughout the '50s and in to the '60s, McDaniel produced and presented live stage shows with "just about every major rock star of the era". He also began studying all aspects of radio station operations, including sales, promotions, contracts, and FCC law.

In 1961 he joined KFWB "Color Radio" as one of the "Seven Swingin' Gentleman", doing weekends and assisting in programming. In 1963 McDaniel was named program director at sister station KEWB Oakland, where he hired disc jockeys Robert W. Morgan and "The Real" Don Steele, pairing them together for the first time.

McDaniel moved to Hawaii in 1966 when owner Cecil Heftel hired him as general manager of KSSK AM/FM Honolulu. Under McDaniel's management, KSSK AM and FM became the dominant radio stations in the Honolulu market. In the wake of the death of beloved disk jockey Aku in 1983, McDaniel paired Larry Price and Michael W. Perry together to form the Perry & Price show, which has enjoyed a string of #1 rankings for over thirty years.

As president of Heftel Broadcasting, McDaniel oversaw the acquisition and management of numerous radio stations in the United States. This included WLUP Chicago, Y-100 Miami, and KLVE-FM Los Angeles, the first and still largest Hispanic FM station in that market.

== Personal life ==
McDaniel married Joyce Louise Baker August 30, 1948. They had two daughters, Kathleen Marie (August 22, 1949) and Christine Louise (April 7, 1952). The couple divorced in 1963. In 1966, McDaniel married Eleanor 'Ellie' Ruth Spiri-Lindbergh (June 8, 1935 – December 31, 2010). They remained together until her death from cancer.

== Death ==
On March 26, 2014, Earl McDaniel died of cancer in Peoria, Arizona.
