= KSSK =

KSSK may refer to:

- KSSK (AM), a radio station (590 AM) licensed to Honolulu, Hawaii, United States
- KSSK-FM, a radio station (92.3 FM) licensed to Waipahu, Hawaii, United States
