= KSSK (AM) =

Adult contemporary formatted AM radio station

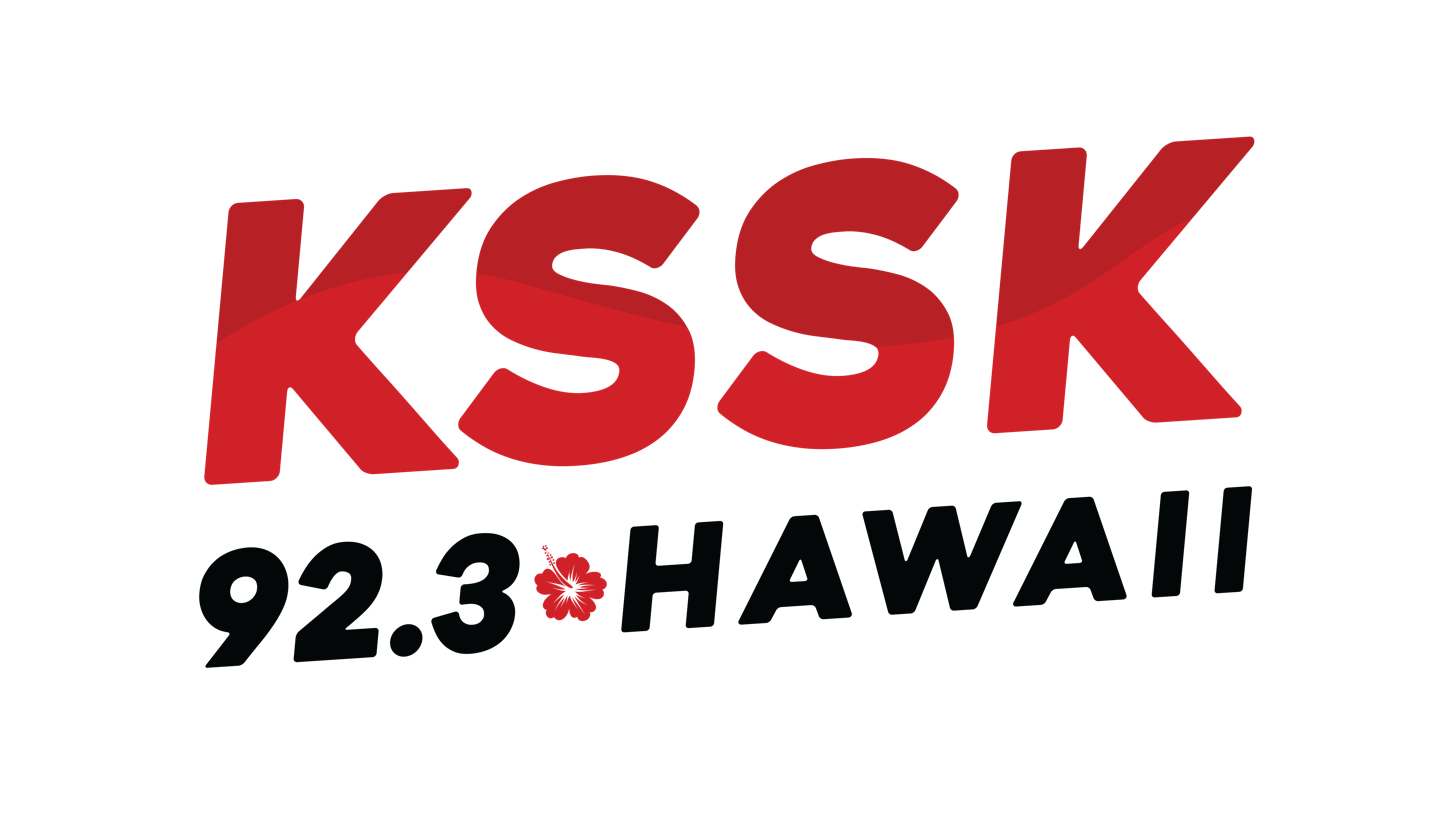
- Honolulu, Hawaii; United States
- Broadcast area: Honolulu metropolitan area
- Frequency: 590 kHz
- Branding: AM 590 & 92-3 KSSK

Programming
- Format: Adult contemporary

Ownership
- Owner: iHeartMedia, Inc.; (iHM Licenses, LLC)
- Sister stations: KDNN; KHVH; KIKI; KSSK-FM; KUBT; KUCD

History
- First air date: March 15, 1930
- Former call signs: KGMB (1930–1980)
- Former frequencies: 1320 kHz (1930–1940)
- Call sign meaning: Phonetically similar to "kiss"

Technical information
- Licensing authority: FCC
- Facility ID: 48774
- Class: B
- Power: 7,800 watts
- Transmitter coordinates: 21°19′15″N 157°52′22″W
- Repeater: 92.3 KSSK-FM (Waipahu)

Links
- Public license information: Public file; LMS
- Webcast: Listen live (via iHeartRadio)
- Website: ksskradio.iheart.com

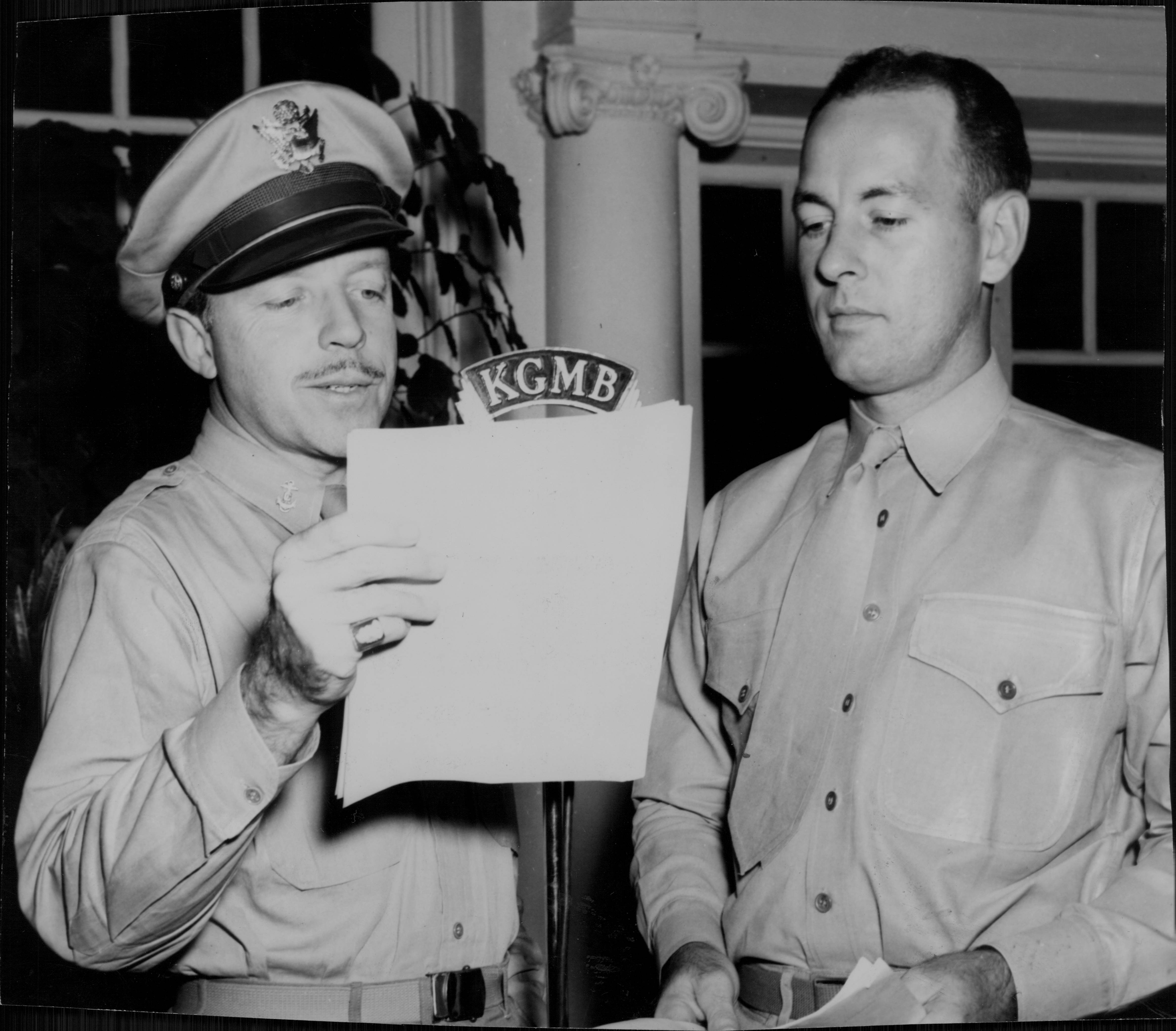
KGMB in 1945

KSSK (590 AM) is a commercial AM radio station licensed to Honolulu, Hawaii, United States. Owned by iHeartMedia, it carries an adult contemporary format simulcasting KSSK-FM (92.3), with studios in the Kalihi neighborhood of Honolulu and transmitter sited on Dillingham Boulevard near the Kapalama Canal, about a mile from the studios. KSSK serves as Hawaii's primary AM station entry point for the Emergency Alert System, with KRTR-FM providing PEP capabilities on FM.

KSSK-AM-FM use the slogan "Hawaii's Favorite", and Nielsen consistently ranks the pair as Honolulu's most listened-to radio station. The stations are home to the Perry & the Posse morning show. Both stations are also heard on Oceanic Spectrum Cable digital channel 867 for the entire state of Hawaii, via the DishHD satellite TV service in Taiwan, and also USEN's Sound Planet satellite radio service in Japan.

== History ==
=== KGMB ===
The station was first authorized in December 1929, with the sequentially issued call sign of KGMB, to the Honolulu Broadcasting Company. It was initially licensed for operation with 500 watts on 1320 kilocycles. After a short period of testing, it made its debut broadcast on March 15, 1930. In 1940, KGMB moved to 590 kHz, where it has been ever since.

Prior to the December 7, 1941, attack on Pearl Harbor, KGMB was asked to broadcast music in order to provide long-range guidance to a flight of Boeing B-17 Flying Fortresses on their way to Hawaii from the mainland. Japanese aircraft used the same transmissions for guidance while approaching the islands to make their bombing runs. During the attack, KGMB dispatched reports to CBS Radio, which in turn were cited on-air by John Charles Daly, who anchored the network's coverage of that day's news.

During these days as KGMB, the longtime jingle One of the Good Things about Hawaii is Wonderful was first heard on the radio as early as the 60s before former sister station KGMB-TV adopted it for television and campaign use. The jingle is still in use at the end of KGMB's weekday morning newscast Hawaii News Now Sunrise at 7 a.m. where the jingle plays during the copyright holder. The jingle was produced by PAMS Productions, Inc. at the time (which has since been acquired by JAM Creative Productions).

=== KSSK ===
On Valentine's Day, February 14, 1980, the call letters were changed to KSSK, for "Kiss Radio". For many years, the station was home to Hal "J. Akuhead Pupule" Lewis, better known as Aku. After his death in July 1983, the station moved afternoon personality Michael W. Perry to the morning slot and paired him with morning show substitute (while Aku was ill) Larry Price, a former National Football League player and head coach of the University of Hawaii Rainbow Warriors football team. The duo were known as "Perry & Price".

In 1993, New-Tex Communications bought both KSSK and FM station KXPW for $7.5 million and changed the FM station's call letters to KSSK-FM. At the time, KSSK was the market's #1 station and the new owners wanted to capitalize on that success, especially as music listening was shifting to FM. KSSK-FM began simulcasting part of the day with KSSK, including the top-rated "Perry & Price" morning show. Eventually, the simulcast was expanded to a 24-hour operation.

In 2000, Clear Channel Communications acquired KSSK-AM-FM. In 2014, the company was renamed iHeartMedia, Inc.

== Notable former on-air staff ==
Some notables who have passed through KGMB/KSSK include:

- Earl McDaniel (General Manager credited with putting the station on top)
- Hal Aku Lewis (deceased)
- George "Granny Goose" Groves
- Don Lamons
- Dave Lancaster
- Susan Cruz (who was actually Noland Cruz though while on air as Susan Cruz, he was never a female impersonator. The only link to being female was his name that was given to him by the General Manager)
- Ruth Ann "Hana Ogi" Ogata
- Shawn Sweeny
- Cliff Richards (deceased)
- Myk Prosatiowell
- Mike Murray
- Harvey Weinstein (deceased)
- Kimo Kahoano
- Jim Peters
- Jim Collins
- Shawnee (Smith)
- Noel Grey
- Terry Rosati (News)
- Terry Rosati
- Alan Zukercorn
- Wild Bill Logan
- Steve Carpenter
- Michael Shishido
- Maxwell the night guy (kris sereno)
- Erika Engle (news)
- Dave Curtis (news)
- Maureen Borromeo (Pescaia)-(news)
- Brad Barrett, Director of Programming
- Dick Wainwright
- Denny McPhee
- Jim Erickson
- Lisa D
- Steve Kelly
- Jim Parker
- Skip Baszler
