= Earl McDaniel =

Earl McDaniel may refer to:

- Earl W. McDaniel (1926–1997), professor of physics
- Earl McDaniel (DJ) (1928–2014), American disc jockey, actor and radio executive
