= KMMA =

KMMA may refer to:

- KMMA (FM), a radio station (97.1 FM) in Green Valley, Arizona, United States
- KMMA-CD, a defunct television station (channel 41) in San Luis Obispo, California, United States
- Royal Museum for Central Africa (Koninklijk Museum voor Midden-Afrika), museum in Tervuren, Belgium
- KOND, a radio station (107.5 FM) in Hanford, California, which held the KMMA call sign from April to October 1991
