= Perry & Price =

Perry & The Posse
- Genre: News/Talk/Music
- Running time: 5-10am HST (Mon-Fri); 8-11am HST (Sat)
- Country of origin: United States
- Home station: KSSK (AM) and KSSK-FM
- Hosted by: Michael W. Perry
- Original release: 1983 – present
- Website: KSSK Radio - Perry & the Posse

Perry & The Posse is a morning radio show which airs six days a week on KSSK (AM) and KSSK-FM in Honolulu, Hawaii. The show is currently the number one morning radio show in Hawaii, capturing a 25 percent share of the state's listening audience. It is also consistently number one in market share nationwide in the adult contemporary format.

== History ==
After KSSK morning DJ Hal "Aku" Lewis died in 1983, KSSK moved then-afternoon host Michael W. Perry to the morning slot and paired him with former football coach Larry Price, who at the time was vice president of public relations for the station. Although Price had done some TV investigative reporting, he'd "never done radio, never even thought about it... then I had to get used to talking to a red light (in the studio)." The first time the pair had met was during one of the Jerry Lewis telethons in the 1970s. According to Perry, "[Larry] dared me to jump into a large pool of Jell-O fully dressed. I did that, for Jerry’s kids, but vowed revenge. I have been extracting that revenge very slowly over the past 25 years."

From the beginning, people in the industry and in the listening public were skeptical that the show would work. According to Price, "Here's a haole guy with a local name and local guy with a haole name... One is from Virginia, the other is from Kalihi. How can these guys get along?"

One item that Perry & Price kept from Aku's morning show was the "Coconut Wireless" name and sound effect that begins their news reports. According to Perry, "I think [Aku] had been using that [name and effect] since 1966." Larry Price, one-half of the duo, ended his 33-year run in May 2016 on the top-rated morning radio show in Hawaii to focus on other interests.

== The "Posse" ==
One of the show's mainstays, which the station as a whole has adopted, is its cell phone "posse" network. Listeners make up this posse and serve as the watchdogs of the community. They call in to report traffic incidents and also report crimes and real-time updates (for example, where a stolen vehicle was last seen), although the station discourages people from directly confronting the criminals. Sometimes the network is even ahead of the local police, who are said to have radios tuned to the station to catch updates.

The Posse has been so successful with catching criminals that a local bank created a C.A.T.C.H. (Citizens Against Troublemakers and Criminals in Hawaii) Fund. For every crime incident that the Posse successfully resolves, the bank donates $1,000 to the fund. Near the end of the calendar year, listeners vote to determine which local charity receives the proceeds from the fund.

== The Saturday Morning Show ==
Perry & Price's Saturday Morning Show, a live breakfast show, started from the Ilikai Hotel's Champeaux. Since then, the show has been held at the Sheraton Waikiki's Hanohano Room, the John Dominis restaurant, and Jimmy Buffett's at The Beachcomber. Since February 2012, the show has been held at the Jade Dynasty Restaurant at the Ala Moana Shopping Center. The show reportedly has one thing commercial radio has lacked for many years—a sense of spontaneity. According to Price, "it's wild, it's unpredictable... uncertainty makes it interesting." Through the years, the Saturday morning show has attracted local and national celebrities, including Dolly Parton, Oprah Winfrey and Arnold Schwarzenegger. The show airs live from 8 to 11 a.m. Hawaii time most Saturdays. On Saturdays that the show is not held, the station airs a compilation ("The Best of the Saturday Morning Show") of sound bites from previous shows during the same time slot.

== Emergency information ==
In addition to their weekday and Saturday morning shows, Perry and Price have also gone on the air during emergencies, as KSSK is the state's designated emergency action system radio station. For example, when two earthquakes caused a power outage on Oahu in 2006, Perry and Price went on the air to deliver information from Hawaii State Civil Defense to their listeners.

== "Coconut Wireless" news and commentary ==
Perry & Price's "Coconut Wireless" news and commentary typically sees Perry taking the lead on national and international politics, while Price focuses on local politics, news and sports. Although the duo's slogan is "Perry on the left and Price on the right," their political views are the other way round. Perry describes himself as having "become much more conservative over the years... even though I was a Kennedy liberal. Hawaii is actually a much more conservative state than people realize." Price meanwhile is a dedicated middle-roader.

Their political commentary has occasionally drawn fire, such as when one of their comments elicited an angry phone call from then-mayor Eileen Anderson. A more controversial incident happened in 2007, when Hawaii Senate Majority Leader Gary Hooser (D-Kauai, Niihau) called in to talk about a legislative session that had wrapped the day prior. During the 15-minute interview, Hooser used the word "honest" in asking the hosts and listeners to assess some of the issues that arose in the session. That led to Price asking Hooser where he was from (California) and whether he had blue eyes (he did). Price then said:

When local people hear somebody from the Mainland talk about how honest everything is that means that something's wrong. You know when they say 'frankly' or 'honestly' we did a lot of things, you know and stuff like that, that sounds suspicious.

As a result of the exchange, several Democrats and their supporters lambasted Price, calling him racist. On the following show, Price apologized, saying:

I would like to take this time to apologize to our KSSK listeners and the people of the state of Hawaii for the inappropriate remarks made to Sen. Hooser on Friday morning's show. If my comments were offensive to anyone, I realize it was wrong to make them. There's no room for this type of insensitive language that I used. I have learned from this, and I hope that Sen. Hooser will accept my apology.

Perry defended his co-host, saying:

You're crazy, you don't have to apologize. I am the blue-eyed member of this morning team. This was not about racism; it was about hypocrisy.

While Hooser appreciated the apology, he believed that Perry and Price, as well as KSSK, were not taking the situation seriously. Several callers to the radio show agreed, comparing Price to CBS Radio's Don Imus, a shock jock who had been fired over a controversial remark about the Rutgers University women's basketball team. In response, Perry said:

A 15-second sound bite overwhelms a devastating, revealing 15-minute interview about our dysfunctional state Senate. We have a broken system here and we keep electing the people who are broken because nobody challenges them. So we challenge them and what gets reported? Blue eyes. ... You don't have to apologize, the Senate has to apologize. Blue-eyed Perry on the left.

== 25th anniversary ==
In 2008, the Perry & Price show celebrated its 25th anniversary. According to Perry:

[We have] no clue as what makes us endure. We just knew we didn't want to burn brightly for a short time and then fizzle... we are dinosaurs! This kind of thing just doesn't happen in radio. Go all over the mainland and you cannot find a show like it. We're the Odd Couple, but it just works, probably because we have the same sense of humor.
