= K256AS =

Coordinates: 21.3137°N 157.8619°W

Relays KUCD-HD2, Pearl City
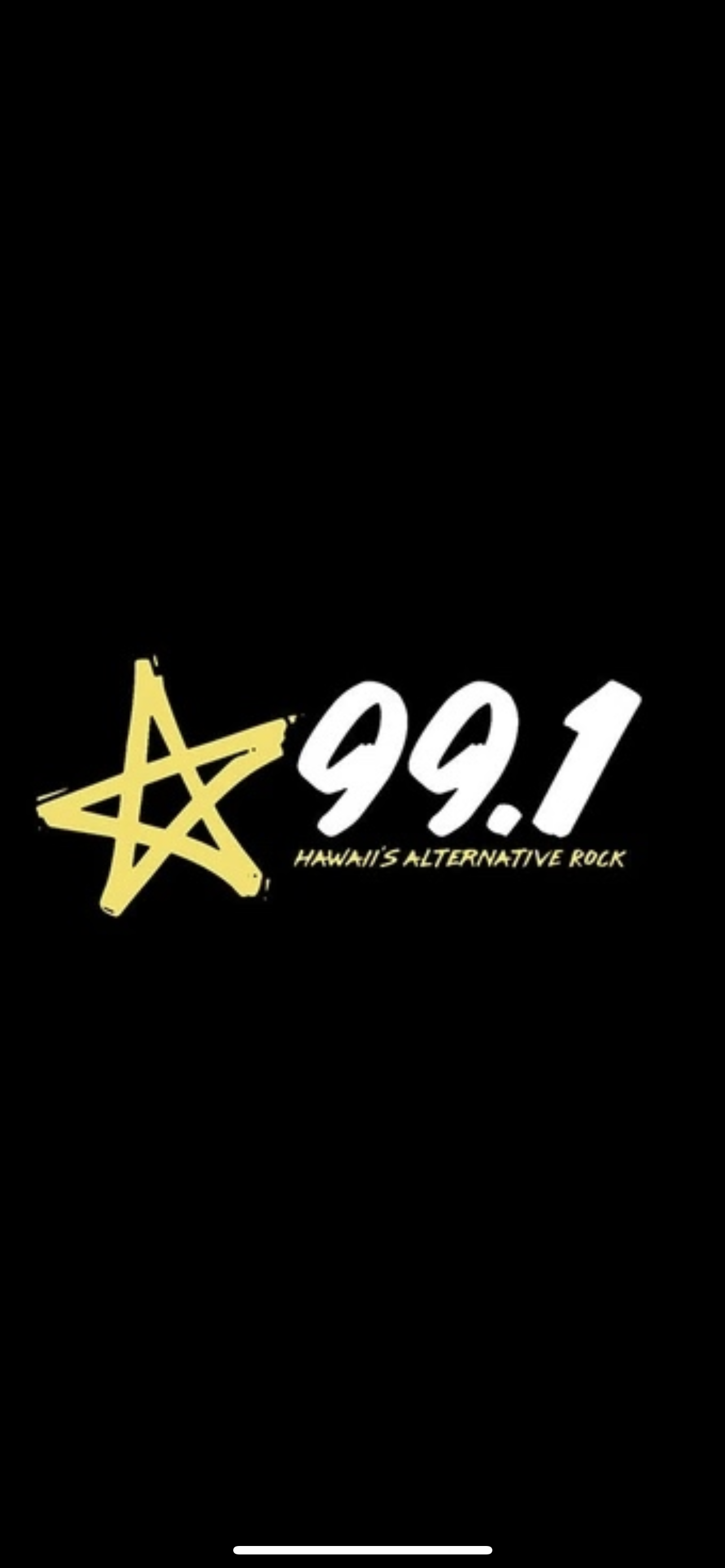
- Honolulu, Hawaii; United States
- Broadcast area: Oahu
- Frequency: 99.1 MHz
- Branding: Star 99.1

Programming
- Format: Alternative rock
- Affiliations: Compass Media Networks; Premiere Networks

Ownership
- Owner: iHeartMedia, Inc.; (iHM Licenses, LLC)
- Sister stations: KDNN; KHVH; KIKI; KSSK; KSSK-FM; KUBT; KUCD

History
- First air date: 2007

Technical information
- Licensing authority: FCC
- Facility ID: 152379
- Class: D
- ERP: 250 watts
- HAAT: 31.7 meters (104 ft)

Links
- Public license information: Public file; LMS
- Webcast: Listen Live
- Website: star991hawaii.iheart.com

K256AS (99.1 FM, "Star 99.1") is a relay transmitter in Honolulu, Hawaii. Owned by iHeartMedia, the station serves as an analog simulcast of KUCD-HD2, KUCD's HD Radio subchannel, carrying an alternative rock format.

== Station History ==
The license to this station was granted on July 30, 2007, as a retranslator for KDNN, airing traditional Hawaiian music as "Hawai’i No Ka Oi" (translated as "Indeed the Best"). Local radio personalities Lanai and Augie (previously of main KDNN station) hosted their own morning talk show Weekdays from 6 to 9 AM.

On June 27, 2014, the format was replaced by the iHeartRadio EDM/Dance platform "Evolution" and switched its HD2 subchannel carrier from KDNN to KHJZ. The station follows the Dance/EDM "Evolution" format, but is customized for Honolulu with local traffic reports and liners targeting its competitors. "Hawai’i No Ka Oi" continues on KDNN's HD2 sub channel and as an iHeartRadio platform.

On September 9, 2016, K256AS dropped the "Evolution" format to take KHJZ's displaced Rhythmic AC/Classic Hip-Hop format, and rebranded as "99.1 Jamz." The move was to allow KUBT to incorporate the Dance/EDM crossovers into its relaunched Rhythmic Top 40 direction.

On November 22, 2019, K256AS dropped the "Jamz" format (which continued on KUBT-HD2 and on its own iHeart stream, rebranded as "Jamz Hawaii") and flipped to an Asian CHR format as PoP! 99.1. The station's new format predominantly features K-pop (including collaborations with U.S. artists), as well as other Chinese, Filipino, and Japanese acts.

On May 16, 2023, iHeartMedia announced that KUCD and K256AS/KUCD-HD2 would swap formats at 10 AM the following Thursday, the 18th, with K256AS set to inherit the alternative rock format of 101.9 as "Star 99.1".
