= KDNN =

Hawaiian contemporary hit radio station in Honolulu

- Logos for KDNN's primary and secondary channels
- Honolulu, Hawaii; United States
- Broadcast area: Oahu
- Frequency: 98.5 MHz (HD Radio)
- Branding: Island 98.5

Programming
- Language: English
- Format: Hawaiian contemporary hit radio
- Subchannels: HD2: Traditional Hawaiian music "Hawai’i No Ka’Oi"

Ownership
- Owner: iHeartMedia; (iHM Licenses, LLC)
- Sister stations: KHVH; KIKI; KSSK; KSSK-FM; KUBT; KUCD; K256AS

History
- First air date: July 4, 1988
- Former call signs: KHHH (1988–1994); KKLV (1994–1999)

Technical information
- Licensing authority: FCC
- Facility ID: 40144
- Class: C1
- ERP: 51,000 watts
- HAAT: 18 meters (59 ft)
- Transmitter coordinates: 21°18′37.6″N 157°51′33.1″W

Links
- Public license information: Public file; LMS
- Webcast: Listen live (via iHeartRadio); HD2: Listen live (via iHeartRadio)
- Website: island985.iheart.com

KDNN (98.5 FM, "Island 98.5") is a commercial Hawaiian contemporary hit radio formatted radio station based in Honolulu, Hawaii. The iHeartMedia outlet broadcasts with an ERP of 51 kW. It also transmits on Oceanic Spectrum digital channel 851 for the entire state of Hawaii. Its studios are located in the Kalihi neighborhood of Honolulu, while its transmitter is located downtown.

== History ==
98.5 signed on the air on Independence Day, 1988, as KHHH, "The Wave", boasting a new age (or "smooth jazz") format. Soon after, the station picked up the satellite format "Z-Rock", on May 17, 1991, and for a time boasted that adrenaline-pumping, testosterone fueled format. When that didn't work, KHHH began simulcasting its all-news AM sibling KHVH, in August 1992. Soon after, the station flipped again, as KKLV with a classic hits format (which was launched in March 1994), but on October 22, 1999, at noon, they would flip to the "Island Rhythm" format, which targeted young adults with a mix of contemporary Hawaiian hits, reggae and local fare. Launched as Island Rhythm 98–5, Mornings were anchored by Lanai & Augie, and popular disc jockeys Rodney Villanuewa, Wendy From Waianae, Eddie L, Jake, Pomai, John James, Makani, Big Steve and K Kamani made KDNN, Honolulu's most listened to station. Around 2005, the station name was shortened from Island Rhythm 98.5 to simply Island 98.5.

KDNN is one of Honolulu's FM stations whose format is geared toward native Hawaiians. The stations KQMQ, KCCN, and KINE also target local Hawaiians.

In May 2009, after a very successful 19-year run at rhythmic CHR KIKI-FM, Rory Wild & The Wake Up Crew moved to KDNN-FM bringing along popular features Wild Wahine Wednesday, Psychic Thursday, and Stupid Joke Friday. Island 98.5 immediately exploded in the ratings overtaking longtime rival KCCN-FM and closing in on sister station KSSK-FM for the highest ratings in Honolulu. At around the same time, the iHeartRadio app took off, and Island 98.5 became available worldwide.

In 2018, KDNN-FM started the Island Music Awards in order to honor the popular recording artists on their playlist

== KDNN-HD2 ==
KDNN previously offered country Music on its HD2 side channel. As of 2012, it offers traditional Hawaiian Music branded as "Hawai’i No Ka’Oi" (translated as "Indeed the Best"). Previously, "Hawai’i No Ka’Oi" simulcasted on a translator with callsign K256AS on 99.1.
