= Michael W. Perry =

American radio personality

Michael Ward Perry is the host of the Perry & The Posse show on KSSK-FM in Honolulu, Hawaii. He also hosts the Hawaiian Moving Company television show on KGMB in Honolulu.

== Biography ==
Perry was born in Michigan, but grew up in Arlington, Virginia, and Washington, D.C., working in the Pentagon. In 1969, he received a B.S. in Psychology from Michigan State University, then served as a Navy Lieutenant in the Pacific Submarine Force.

Perry launched his radio career during his last two years of college. As he recalls, "I was a disc jockey by night, a student by day." In 1972, he moved to Hawaii, joining KKUA and later KSSK (known as K59 at the time), working the afternoon drive-time slot. After Hal "Aku" Lewis died in July 1983, KSSK moved Perry to the morning slot and paired him with Larry Price.

== The Hawaiian Moving Company ==
The Hawaiian Moving Company had started as a disco dance show hosted by radio personality Kamasami Kong, before switching to an entertainment magazine format with Perry as host and executive producer. The first segment he taped was an interview with Tom Selleck and John Hillerman on the set of Magnum, P.I., which aired for eight years.

== Other Shows ==
Other shows that Perry has been on include One West Waikiki, Jake and the Fatman, Baywatch Hawaii and the mini-series Blood and Orchids. In the 1999 film Molokai: The Story of Father Damien, Perry had a small role as royal physician Georges Phillipe Trousseau.
