= KUCD =

Radio station in Honolulu, Hawai'i

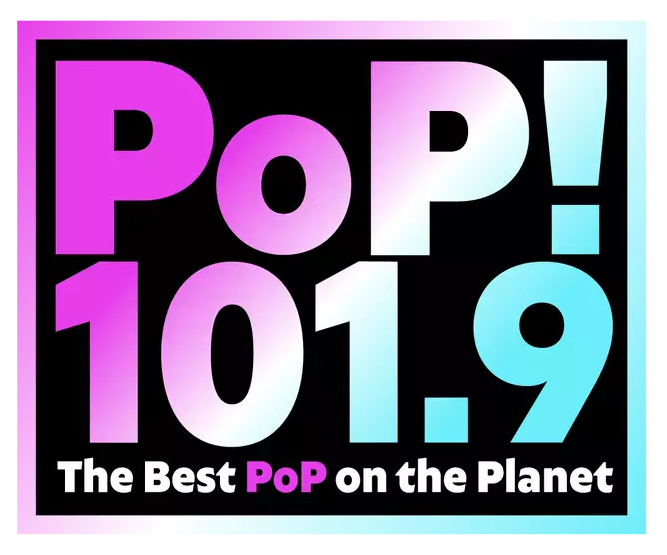
- Pearl City, Hawaii; United States
- Broadcast area: Honolulu, Hawaii
- Frequency: 101.9 MHz (HD Radio)
- Branding: Pop! 101.9

Programming
- Language: Korean
- Format: Contemporary hit radio
- Subchannels: HD2: Star 99.1 (Alternative rock); HD3: ALT Radio

Ownership
- Owner: iHeartMedia, Inc.; (iHM Licenses, LLC)
- Sister stations: KDNN; KHVH; KIKI; KSSK; KSSK-FM; KUBT; K256AS

History
- First air date: January 23, 1995
- Call sign meaning: Former branding as smooth jazz station "CD 101.9"

Technical information
- Licensing authority: FCC
- Facility ID: 48778
- Class: C
- ERP: 100,000 watts (horiz.); 81,000 watts (vert.)
- HAAT: 599 meters (1,965 ft)
- Transmitter coordinates: 21°23′39.6″N 158°05′51.1″W
- Translator: HD2: 99.1 K256AS (Honolulu)

Links
- Public license information: Public file; LMS
- Webcast: Listen live (via iHeartRadio); Listen live (HD2); Listen live (HD3)
- Website: pop1019.iheart.com star991hawaii.iheart.com (HD2)

KUCD (101.9 FM, "Pop! 101.9") is a commercial radio station licensed to Pearl City, Hawaii, United States, and serving the Honolulu metropolitan area. Owned by iHeartMedia, it broadcasts an Asian Top 40-CHR format, playing hits from K-pop and other countries in Asia. Studios are located in the Kalihi neighborhood of Honolulu. It also transmits on Charter Spectrum digital cable channel 853 for the entire state.

KUCD's transmitter is sited on Palehua Road in Kapolei. KUCD broadcasts in HD Radio: the HD2 subchannel carries an alternative rock format and feeds 250-watt FM translator K256AS at 99.1 MHz.

== History ==
KUCD signed on the air with regular programming on January 23, 1995. It was co-owned with KSSK-AM-FM. Branded CD 101.9, It was a smooth jazz station, playing a mix of jazz instrumentals and some R&B-style vocals as well as contemporary Hawaiian music.

On August 29, 1997, at 3 p.m., it switched to modern AC as "Star 101.9." It further evolved towards modern rock in 2001. This lasted until 2009, when it shifted back to modern AC; with this format change, KUCD changed its positioner from "Hawaii's New Music Alternative" to "90's, 2K, and Today". In early 2011, KUCD reverted to the modern rock format, albeit with a slight modern AC lean, using their previous "Hawaii's New Music Alternative" slogan once again. A few months after this, KUCD dropped the modern AC lean, and became a modern rock station once again.

In 2013, the station changed its positioner to "Hawaii's Alternative". With the May 2020 format flip of KPOI from alternative to soft AC, KUCD became the only radio station in Honolulu playing alternative rock music. KUCD's HD2 sub-channel aired Asian Pop formatted PoP! 99.1 at 101.9-2 and on the iHeartRadio app.

On May 16, 2023, iHeartMedia announced that KUCD and K256AS/KUCD-HD2 would swap formats at 10 AM the following Thursday. On May 18th, the full-power 101.9 frequency took over the Asian pop music format of K256AS as "Pop! 101.9". With its high-power signal, it becomes the largest K-pop radio station in the United States. The alternative rock previously found on 101.9 switched over to the 99.1 FM translator.
