= KHVH =

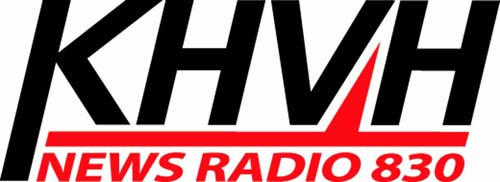
- Honolulu, Hawaii; United States
- Broadcast area: Honolulu metropolitan area
- Frequency: 830 kHz
- Branding: "AM 830"

Programming
- Format: News/talk
- Network: Fox News Radio
- Affiliations: Premiere Networks; KHON-TV; Las Vegas Raiders Radio Network

Ownership
- Owner: iHeartMedia, Inc.; (iHM Licenses, LLC)
- Sister stations: KDNN; KIKI; KSSK; KSSK-FM; KUBT; KUCD; K256AS

History
- First air date: April 20, 1951
- Former call signs: KIKI (1951–1993)
- Call sign meaning: Kaiser Hawaiian Village Hotel

Technical information
- Licensing authority: FCC
- Facility ID: 34591
- Class: B
- Power: 11,000 watts
- Transmitter coordinates: 21°19′15″N 157°52′22″W

Links
- Public license information: Public file; LMS
- Webcast: Listen Live
- Website: khvhradio.iheart.com

KHVH (830 AM) is a commercial radio station in Honolulu, Hawaii. It broadcasts a news/talk format and is owned by iHeartMedia, Inc. Its studios and offices are on Iwilei Road in the Kalihi neighborhood of Honolulu.

KHVH is powered at 11,000 watts, using a non-directional antenna. The transmitter is at the corner of Dillingham Boulevard & Kokoa Street near the Kapalama Canal. It also transmits on Oceanic Spectrum digital channel 881 for the entire state of Hawaii.

== Programming ==
Weekdays begin with a talk and information show hosted by Rick Hamada. The rest of the weekday schedule is nationally syndicated conservative talk programs: The Sean Hannity Show, The Glenn Beck Radio Program, The Clay Travis and Buck Sexton Show, The Jesse Kelly Show, The Joe Pags Show and Coast to Coast AM with George Noory. Due to time zone differences, Hannity, Kelly, Pags, Travis and Sexton's shows are all recorded and delayed for broadcast at Hawaiian time. The 6 p.m. newscast from KHON-TV 2, Honolulu's Fox Network affiliate, is also carried on weeknights.

Weekends feature specialty shows on money, health, golf, real estate, home improvement and technology, some of which are paid brokered programming. Syndicated weekend programs include The Ben Ferguson Show, The Weekend with Michael Brown and Armstrong & Getty as well as repeats of weekday programs. KHVH is an affiliate of the Las Vegas Raiders Radio Network. Most hours begin with an update from Fox News Radio.

== History ==
The station signed on the air on April 20, 1951, before Hawaii was a state. Its original call sign was KIKI and it was powered at only 250 watts. Its studios were at 320 Ward Avenue. In the 1960s and 70s, KIKI had a Top 40 format and was an affiliate of the ABC Contemporary Network.

The original KHVH 990 signed on the air in 1957. The call letters KHVH stand for Kaiser Hawaiian Village Hotel in Waikiki, originally owned by Henry J. Kaiser. Today it is the Hilton Hawaiian Village Hotel. KHVH 990 had its studios at the hotel.

In 1986 KIKI 830 flipped to oldies while the Top 40 hit radio format moved to its FM sister station, the former KMAI-FM. It became KIKI-FM, known as "I94" (now co-owned "93.9 The Beat"). From 1986 through 1990, each year KIKI added an additional year to its repertoire; e.g., if it were playing songs from artists up until 1960, beginning January 1, it would then add songs from 1961, maintaining its oldies format.

In 1993, KIKI and KHVH swapped signals when the outlets became sister stations, owned by Clear Channel Communications based in San Antonio. The oldies format and KIKI call letters moved to 990 AM, while the talk format and KHVH call sign moved to 830 AM. The station once broadcast in AM stereo using the C-QUAM system. In 2014, Clear Channel switched its corporate name to iHeartMedia, Inc.

== Logo history ==
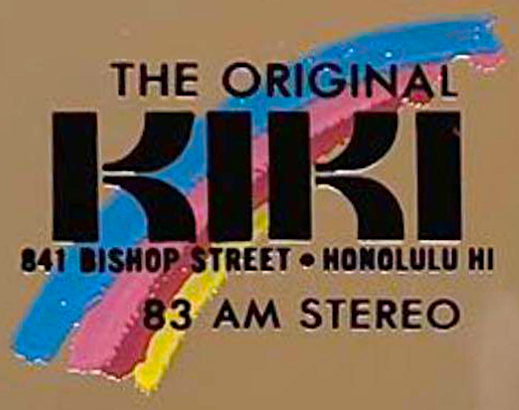
Pre-1993 KIKI "83 AM Stereo" logo.
