= KRDA =

Coordinates: 37.128°N 119.678°W

- Clovis, California; United States
- Broadcast area: Fresno, California
- Frequency: 92.1 MHz (HD Radio)
- Branding: Enamorada 92.1

Programming
- Format: Spanish AC

Ownership
- Owner: Latino Media Network; (Latino Media Network, LLC)
- Sister stations: KLLE, KOND

History
- First air date: 1985 (as KHOT-FM)
- Former call signs: KHOT-FM (1985–1989); KXMX (1989–1994); KZFO (1994–2004); KOND (2004–2016)

Technical information
- Licensing authority: FCC
- Facility ID: 39567
- Class: B
- ERP: 39,000 watts
- HAAT: 170 meters (560 ft)

Links
- Public license information: Public file; LMS
- Webcast: Listen live (via iHeartRadio)
- Website: https://www.921enamorada.com/

KRDA (92.1 FM) is licensed to Clovis, California. It serves the Fresno, California, area. It is owned by Latino Media Network; under a local marketing agreement, it was programmed by former owner TelevisaUnivision's Uforia Audio Network until 2024. KRDA broadcasts a Spanish adult contemporary format.

== History ==
Previous logo

On August 2, 2016, 92.1 swapped call letters and formats with KRDA 107.5, Spanish Adult Hits.

KRDA was one of eighteen radio stations that TelevisaUnivision sold to Latino Media Network in a $60 million deal announced in June 2022, approved by the Federal Communications Commission (FCC) that November, and completed on December 30, 2022. Under the terms of the deal, Univision agreed to continue programming the station for up to one year under a local marketing agreement.

On January 1, 2025, The Station Rebranded From AMOR 92.1 To Enamorada 92.1 Keeping The Same Spanish AC Format.
