= KOND =

- Hanford, California; United States
- Broadcast area: Fresno, California
- Frequency: 107.5 MHz
- Branding: La Explosiva 107.5

Programming
- Language: Spanish
- Format: Regional Mexican

Ownership
- Owner: Latino Media Network; (Latino Media Network, LLC)
- Sister stations: KLLE; KRDA

History
- First air date: September 1976
- Former call signs: KKYS (1976–1984); KLTK (1984–1986); KCLQ (1986–1987); KCLQ-FM (1987–1990); KZRZ (1990); KFRZ (1990); KZZF (1990–1991); KMMA (1991); KCML (1991–1993); KMPH-FM (1993–2005); KVBE (2005–2006); KRDA (2006–2016)
- Call sign meaning: Que Onda! (former branding)

Technical information
- Licensing authority: FCC
- Facility ID: 26266
- Class: B
- ERP: 24,600 watts
- HAAT: 215 meters (705 ft)
- Transmitter coordinates: 36°38′12″N 118°56′34″W

Links
- Public license information: Public file; LMS
- Webcast: Listen live (via iHeartRadio)

KOND (107.5 FM, "La Explosiva 107.5") is a commercial radio station licensed to Hanford, California, United States and serves the Fresno area. The station is owned by Latino Media Network; under a local marketing agreement, it was programmed by former owner TelevisaUnivision's Uforia Audio Network until 2024. KOND broadcasts a Regional Mexican format.

== History ==
=== Early years ===
The station at 107.5 FM first signed on in September 1976 as KKYS. It was owned by Kings Broadcasters and broadcast a middle of the road music format. In October 1983, Kings sold KKYS and its AM sister station KNGS to Sunrise Communications for $1.75 million. The new owner changed the FM station's call sign to KLTK the following year. In August 1986, Sunrise sold the combo to Liggett Broadcasting Group for $2.8 million; at the time, KLTK aired a contemporary hit radio format. Liggett then flipped the FM outlet to classic rock (then known as "classic hits", a term now referring to a broad-based format featuring 1970s—1990s music). The call letters became KCLQ on October 27, later adjusted to KCLQ-FM in September 1987 when KNGS took on the KCLQ call sign.

In early 1990, the station became the first FM affiliate of ABC Radio's Z Rock network, airing a syndicated format featuring hard rock and heavy metal music. KCLQ-FM changed its call letters to KZRZ shortly after the flip. This new call sign prompted a restraining order from the similarly named KRZR, a competing rock station. KZRZ subsequently chose the KFRZ call sign; however, that selection triggered threats of legal action from another station, KFRE. The Z Rock affiliate settled on KZZF.

On April 1, 1991, KZZF dropped Z Rock in favor of adult contemporary, adopting new call letters KMMA on April 22. Six months later, in October 1991, the station became KCML, a country music outlet branded "Camel Country".

In June 1992, Liggett Broadcasting sold KCML to Pappas Telecasting, owner of KMPH-TV in Visalia, for $550,000. The new owner installed a news/talk format the following year, using reporters from its TV sister station; new call letters KMPH-FM followed on February 22, 1993. In April 2005, KMPH-FM flipped to rhythmic adult contemporary as KVBE, "Vibe 107.5".

=== Univision/Uforia era (2005–2025) ===
In October 2005, Pappas Telecasting Cos. sold KVBE to Univision Radio for $10 million. Univision began programming the station immediately via a time brokerage agreement and changed its call letters to KRDA on January 31, 2006.

Previous logo

On August 2, 2016, KRDA exchanged frequencies with KOND, sending the Spanish adult hits format to 92.1 FM. The station at 107.5 FM became KOND, a regional Mexican outlet branded "La Jefa 107.5".

KOND was one of eighteen radio stations that TelevisaUnivision sold to Latino Media Network in a $60 million deal announced in June 2022, approved by the Federal Communications Commission (FCC) that November, and completed on December 30, 2022. Under the terms of the deal, Univision agreed to continue programming the station for up to one year under a local marketing agreement.

=== Latino Media Network era (2024-present) ===
On January 1, 2025, "La Jefa 107.5" branding was changed to "La Explosiva 107.5", with no change in format.
