= KLLE =

Radio station in North Fork, California

Coordinates: 37.295°N 119.565°W

- North Fork, California; United States
- Broadcast area: Fresno metropolitan area
- Frequency: 107.9 MHz
- Branding: La Picosa 107.9

Programming
- Format: Regional Mexican
- Affiliations: Los Angeles Dodgers Spanish Radio Network

Ownership
- Owner: Latino Media Network; (Latino Media Network, LLC)
- Sister stations: KOND, KRDA

History
- First air date: 1995
- Former call signs: KXDE (1990–1995, CP); KZFT (1995–1996); KFIE (1996–1999); KAJZ (1999–2002); KZMR (2002); KZOL (2002–2005)
- Former frequencies: 107.7 MHz (1995–2002)
- Call sign meaning: La Kalle (The Street - former station branding)

Technical information
- Licensing authority: FCC
- Facility ID: 31716
- Class: B1
- ERP: 1,750 watts
- HAAT: 374 meters (1,227 ft)

Links
- Public license information: Public file; LMS
- Webcast: Listen live

KLLE (107.9 FM) is a commercial radio station licensed to North Fork, California, United States. and serving the Fresno metropolitan area. It is known as "La Picosa" and is owned by the Latino Media Network, airing a Regional Mexican format, carrying Los Angeles Dodgers games in Spanish during the baseball season. KLLE's transmitter is sited off of Teaford Saddle Road in Oakhurst.

== History ==
The station signed on the air in 1995. It originally broadcast at 107.7 MHz and was licensed to Merced, California. The call sign was KZFT. It later moved into the Fresno radio market, being licensed to the suburb of North Fork.

Before it switched to a Regional Mexican format, it broadcast Spanish language adult contemporary music. And before that, it played Reggaetón music along with Spanish language hip hop.

On September 28, 2014, the station branding "La Kalle" was changed to "Latino Mix".

On May 2, 2016, KLLE changed its format to Regional Mexican, branded as "Zona MX 107.9". It was programmed by former owner TelevisaUnivision's Uforia Audio Network until 2024.

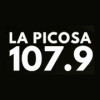
Previous logo

On December 1, 2024, KLLE "Zona Mx 107.9" rebranded as "La Picosa 107.9" while continuing to air Regional Mexican music.
