= KUBT =

Rhythmic contemporary radio station in Honolulu

- Honolulu, Hawaii; United States
- Broadcast area: Honolulu, Hawaii
- Frequency: 93.9 MHz (HD Radio)
- Branding: 93.9 The Beat

Programming
- Format: Rhythmic contemporary
- Subchannels: HD2: Jamz Hawaii (Classic hip hop)

Ownership
- Owner: iHeartMedia, Inc.; (iHM Licenses, LLC)
- Sister stations: KDNN; KHVH; KIKI; KSSK; KSSK-FM; KUCD; K256AS

History
- First air date: February 1, 1979
- Former call signs: KPIG-FM (1978–1980); KMAI (1980–1989); KIKI-FM (1989–2010); KHJZ (2010–2016)
- Call sign meaning: "Beat"

Technical information
- Licensing authority: FCC
- Facility ID: 34592
- Class: C
- ERP: 100,000 watts
- HAAT: 599 meters (1,965 ft)
- Transmitter coordinates: 21°19′37.5″N 157°45′14.1″W

Links
- Public license information: Public file; LMS
- Webcast: Listen live (via iHeartRadio)
- Website: 939beat.iheart.com

KUBT (93.9 FM "93.9 The Beat") is a rhythmic contemporary radio station based in Honolulu, Hawaii. The station operates at 100 kW, is owned by iHeartMedia, Inc. (formerly Clear Channel Communications until September 2014). It is also transmitting on Oceanic Spectrum digital channel 869 for the entire state of Hawaii. Its studios and transmitter are located separately in the Kalihi neighborhood of Honolulu.

== History ==
KUBT, which signed on February 1, 1979, as KPIG (a disco station) and later became album oriented rock-formatted KMAI, has been a rhythmic top 40 in its two incarnations, from 1986 to 2010 (it picked up the KIKI calls in 1989, and was known as "I-94" until 2003, later rebranded as "Hot 93.9" until 2010), and since September 2, 2016, when it returned to the format as the current "93.9 The BEAT."

The KIKI calls and Top 40 music format date back to the early 1970s, when KIKI 830 AM changed to Top 40 (as "Gold Key Radio") from a middle of the road format. The Top 40/CHR format moved to the FM dial as rhythmic-leaning I-94 in 1986 as the AM station went to an oldies format; the AM station is now KHVH.

KIKI was locally famous in the 1980s for its "Brown Bags to Stardom" contest which gave up-and-coming local Hawaii artists a chance at stardom. Some notable winners of the contest have included the female vocal trio Na Leo Pilimehana (1984) and Glenn Medeiros (1986), who would go on to national prominence with hits such as "Nothing's Gonna Change My Love For You" and "She Ain't Worth It."

On September 2, 2010, at Noon, KIKI-FM changed their format to rhythmic adult contemporary, branded as "93.9 Jamz" and picked up the new calls KHJZ (previously used on a radio station in Houston). The station described its format as a "Generation-X" style Rhythmic AC, featuring a hybrid mix of currents from today along with Rhythmic hits from the 1990s and 2000s with Batu influences, hoping to distinguish itself from rival KUMU by billing itself as "it's not your mom's old school," a reference to KUMU's Gold-based Rhythmic AC direction, which favors music from the 1970s, 1980s, and 1990s. Clear Channel also decided to move the KIKI calls back the AM side, where it replaced the call letters of KHBZ. Despite having attracted loyal listeners, the ratings were not impressive and failed to overtake KUMU. By the fall of 2015, KHJZ became more current heavy, though the station still focused on 1990s and 2000s hits.

On September 2, 2016, at 9:39 a.m., nearly six years to the day after the launch of "Jamz", the station flipped back to rhythmic contemporary, this time branded as "93.9 The BEAT." Billing itself as "Hawaii's #1 Hit Music Station," the playlist features a broad mix of Rhythmic Pop/Dance currents, the same type of presentation also played at rivals KDDB and KPHW. On September 9, 2016, KHJZ changed their call letters to KUBT, and added its air staff on September 12. The air staff included the former KDDB morning team of Sam The Man and Hawaiian Ryan.

In 2018, the station changed their slogan to "Hawaii's #1 for Hip Hop and Hits" due to rivals KDDB and more specifically, KPHW, leaning back towards a Top 40 (CHR) format. In 2020, the station altered their slogan to a more focused "Hawaii's #1 for Hip Hop."

== KUBT-HD2 ==
In September 2006, KIKI added an HD2 subchannel that offers an Old School R&B format (Originally it was supposed to have offered Trancid, an Electronica/Dance format, but changed those plans at the last minute). It would be replaced in 2008 by the teen-targeted Top 40/Dance channel "KiWi Radio." After KIKI's flip to Rhythmic AC, its former Rhythmic Top 40 format moved over to its HD2 channel.

On June 27, 2014, the Rhythmic format was replaced with the EDM/Dance "Evolution" platform, which also replaced sister station KDNN's Traditional Hawaiian format at its translator at 99.1, billing itself as "Evolution 99.1." The format follows the national "Evolution" format but customized for Honolulu with local liners (which also includes targeting its Rhythmic Top 40 rivals) and local traffic updates.

On September 9, 2016, KUBT's Rhythmic Adult Contemporary format moved over to the HD2 and FM translator, where it was relaunched as "99.1Jamz", with more emphasis on recurrents and Classic Hip-Hop tracks. The move was to eliminate the duplication of Dance/EDM tracks that have incorporated into KUBT's playlist and direction.

On November 22, 2019, K256AS dropped the "Jamz" format; however, it continues on KUBT-HD2, rebranded as "Jamz Hawaii".

== Previous logos ==
KIKI's previous "Hot 93.9" logo

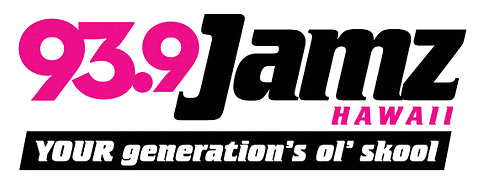
Previous 93.9 Jamz logo, 2010-2015
