= Larry Price (radio personality) =

American radio presenter (1934–2026)

Biographical details
- Born: November 24, 1934; Kaʻaʻawa, Hawaii Territory, U.S.
- Died: March 27, 2026 (aged 91); Honolulu, Hawaii, U.S.

Playing career
- 1961–1964: Hawaii
- Position: Defensive tackle

Coaching career (HC unless noted)
- 1967–1973: Hawaii (assistant)
- 1974–1976: Hawaii

Head coaching record
- Overall: 15–18

Larry David Price (November 24, 1934 – March 27, 2026) was an American athlete, media personality, journalist and civil servant in Hawaii. A resident of Honolulu, he was an author, political news columnist for MidWeek and radio co-host of the locally popular Perry & Price on KSSK-FM alongside Michael W. Perry. He also wrote and produced television documentaries. Price had previously worked as an investigative reporter for Honolulu ABC network affiliate KITV. In celebration of its centennial, the City and County of Honolulu named Price to its official list of Top 100 Citizens.

== Early life and education ==
Price was born in Kaʻaʻawa, Hawaii Territory, on November 24, 1934. He attended President Theodore Roosevelt High School in Honolulu. Price held several college degrees: a Bachelor of Science degree in 1967 and Master of Business Administration in 1971 from the University of Hawaii at Manoa. He also received a 1985 Doctor of Philosophy from the University of Southern California and completed post-doctoral work at Stanford University from 1997 to 2003. He taught as an MBA professor at Chaminade University of Honolulu.

== Athletics ==
After serving in the U.S. Army, Price played defensive tackle for the Hawaii Warriors football team from 1961 to 1964. Price was elected captain in 1962, 1963, and 1964. He played in three Hula Bowl games and had a free agent rookie tryout with the Los Angeles Rams.

== Coaching ==
In 1967, Price became a defensive assistant under Don King at Hawaii. He was retained by King's successor, Dave Holmes. From 1969 to 1972, he was UH's head men’s volleyball coach.

In 1974, Price was promoted to head coach after Holmes' resignation. He was chosen over external candidates Dave Levy and Bob Schloredt. Before coaching his first game, the university's board of regents extended Price's contract without consulting the school's administration, leading to the resignation of five administrators. During Price's tenure as head coach, Hawaii joined NCAA Division I, changed its nickname to the Rainbow Warriors, introduced the “Hula-T” formation, and began playing at Aloha Stadium.

After posting a 6–5 record in each of Price's two seasons as head coach, Hawaii fell to 3–7 in 1976. He resigned in May 1977.

=== Head coaching record ===
Year	Team	Overall	Conference	Standing	Bowl/playoffs
Hawaii Rainbow Warriors (NCAA Division I independent) (1974–1976)
1974	Hawaii	6–5			
1975	Hawaii	6–5			
1976	Hawaii	3–8			
Hawaii:		15–18			
Total:		15–18			

== Radio personality ==
Before working at KSSK, Price worked for the administration of Hawaii Governor George Ariyoshi and served as the University of Hawaii Director of the Small Business Management Program. Congressman Cecil Heftel needed a new vice president of public relations and publicity for his radio station and hired Price for the position in 1977. In August 1983, Price was paired with afternoon radio deejay Michael W. Perry to host the station's morning drive program. A top-rated program in the state, the two continued to host the same program despite various station ownership changes.

Perry and Price hosted a popular live radio variety show each Saturday in front of a ballroom audience. Over twenty years, it had been broadcast from various locations, including from Champeaux's at the Ilikai Hotel, the Hanohano Room of the Sheraton Waikiki Hotel, and John Dominis Restaurant in Honolulu. After six years at Jimmy Buffett's at the Beachcomber, the show had its final broadcast from the KSSK studios at The Dole Cannery. The show's popularity had garnered frequent appearances by celebrities including Arnold Schwarzenegger, Dolly Parton, Oprah Winfrey, and many more.

In May 2016 at the age of 81, Price ended his 33-year run as a co-host of the Perry and Price show. Price simultaneously announced he would begin a new sports show with Rick Hamada on KIKI: FOX Sports 990 Hawai'i, airing Saturdays at 11 a.m.

== Death ==
Price died in Honolulu on March 27, 2026, aged 91.
