= DishHD =

Satellite television provider for Asia

Dish HD
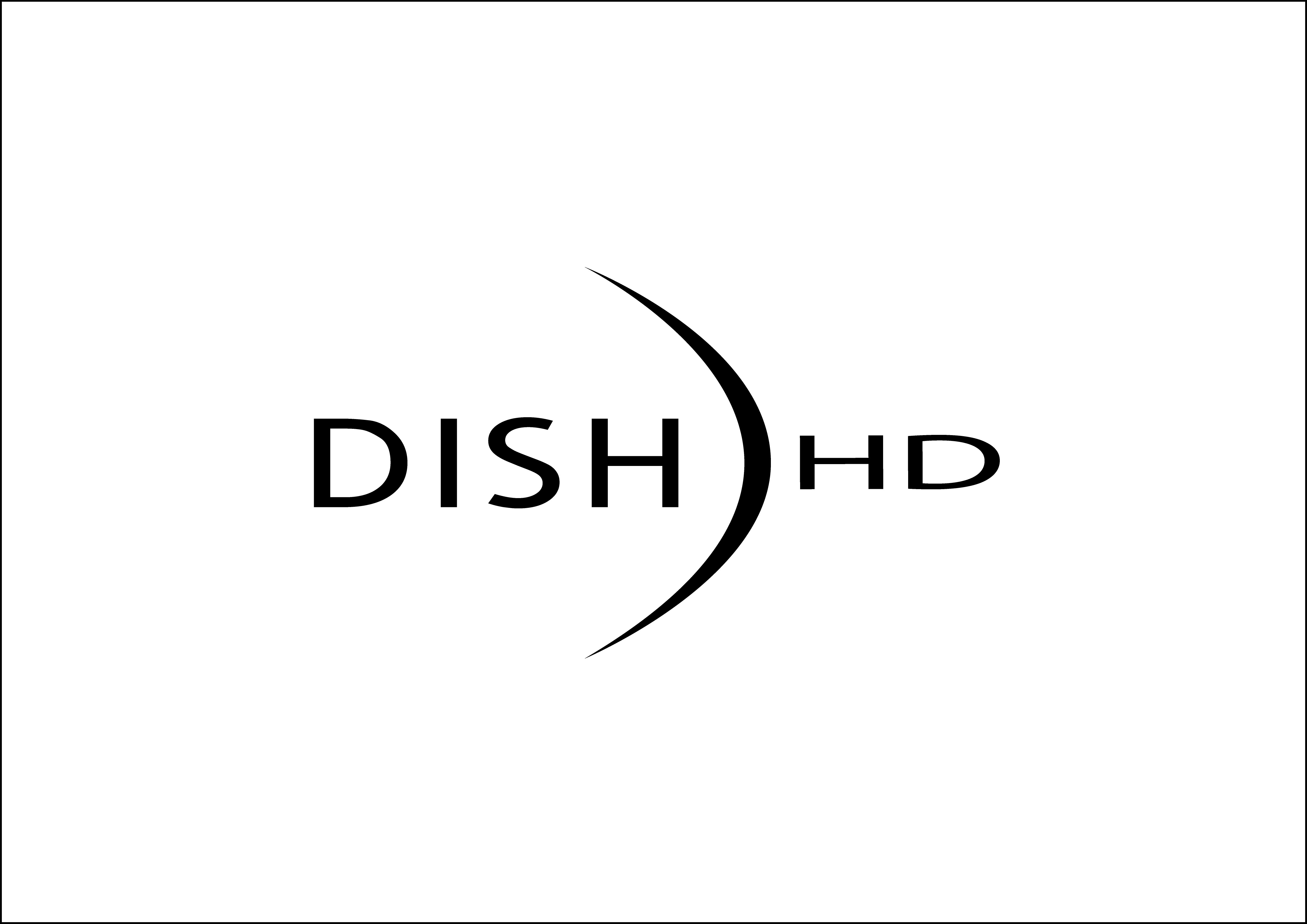
- DishHD logo
- Industry: Telecommunication
- Headquarters: Taipei, Taiwan
- Products: Direct broadcast satellite; High-definition television; Digital radio
- Website: DishHDAsia.com

DishHD is a direct-to-home satellite television service that offers high-definition programming across Asia. The corporate headquarters of DishHD is located in Taipei, Taiwan.

The service was initially introduced by EchoStar International in 2010, with its availability starting in Taiwan and later expanding to other regions.

== See also ==
- Dish Network
