= KIKI (AM) =

- Honolulu, Hawaii; United States
- Broadcast area: Honolulu metropolitan area
- Frequency: 990 kHz
- Branding: Fox Sports 990

Programming
- Format: Sports
- Affiliations: Fox Sports Radio; Navy Midshipmen football

Ownership
- Owner: iHeartMedia, Inc.; (iHM Licenses, LLC)
- Sister stations: KDNN; KHVH; KSSK; KSSK-FM; KUBT; KUCD; K256AS

History
- First air date: March 14, 1957
- Former call signs: KHVH (1957–1994); KIKI (1994–2001); KHBZ (2001–2010)
- Call sign meaning: "Keiki", Hawaiian for "child"

Technical information
- Licensing authority: FCC
- Facility ID: 40143
- Class: B
- Power: 5,700 watts
- Transmitter coordinates: 21°19′15″N 157°52′22″W

Links
- Public license information: Public file; LMS
- Webcast: Listen live (via iHeartRadio)
- Website: foxsports990.iheart.com

KIKI (990 AM, "Fox Sports 990") is a sports radio station licensed to Honolulu, Hawaii, and owned by iHeartMedia. Its studios and transmitter are separately located in the Kalihi neighborhood of Honolulu.

== History ==
The station signed on the air as KHVH on March 14, 1957, three days before the expected date of March 18, by then-owner Kaiser Broadcasting, who would sell the station in 1965.

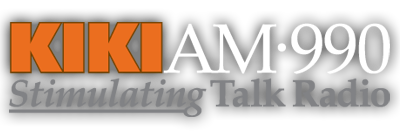
Logo as a talk station, similar to sister station KFI

In 1993, KHVH swapped frequencies with oldies station KIKI, then at 830 kHz. KIKI at 990 would drop oldies for news in 1994, followed by a flip to country music from 1997 to 1999, a simulcast of KIKI-FM 93.9 from 1999 to 2001, and a flip to business news in 2001 as KHBZ, only to evolve into a talk radio format by 2004. In 2008 KHBZ changed its slogan from "The Talk Station" to "Stimulating Talk Radio" On September 2, 2010, KHBZ took possession of the KIKI calls after KIKI-FM flipped formats from rhythmic top 40 to rhythmic AC as KHJZ, bringing the KIKI calls back to 990.

On March 18, 2016, KIKI changed its format from talk to sports, branded as "Fox Sports 990".

KIKI is an affiliate of the Navy Midshipmen football radio network for the benefit of personnel stationed at Naval Station Pearl Harbor and the surrounding area.
