= Hal Lewis (Aku) =

American radio personality (d. 1983)

Herschel Leib Hohenstein, aka Hal Lewis (April 14, 1917 - July 21, 1983), aka J. Akuhead Pupule or Aku, was the morning air personality in 1965 at KGMB, an AM station in Honolulu, Hawaii.

== Biography ==
Lewis was born Herschel Laib Hohenstein in Brooklyn, New York on April 14, 1917. He later legally shortened his name to Hal Lewis. He became a personality in his own right when he moved to Hawaii in 1946 from San Francisco, where he had been an unemployed violinist. His cabaret act failed and he soon became a staff announcer at KGMB in Honolulu. According to his newspaper biography, he was so poor that he had to sleep on Waikiki Beach. Although he was terminated for insubordination within weeks of his arrival, Hal Lewis was able to get another job at KPOA.

It was at KPOA that Lewis perfected his own style of presentation, which incorporated repetitious time checks, and it was this gimmick that caused him to get the name "aku-head" from a furious listener after he had given out the incorrect time on the radio. Lewis then dropped his own name for J. Akuhead Pupule or plain Aku. Another version of this story is that at his first station, the station sales manager and his team brainstormed the moniker to explain to the innocent audience of post-War Honolulu that this talkative Jewish personality looked like a crazy fish head. When the sales manager brought his young son (who would be the third generation of his family to spend his own life on Honolulu's airwaves: Harry B Soria), to the station, he was shocked the first time he saw Aku as he was definitely not the bald-headed aged grandfather figure that his radio voice had conjured in his imagination.

Using the name J. Akuhead Pupule, he had his own short-lived recording label, Aku Records. It had a green label, with a cartoon of Hal Lewis with an exaggerated nose. He persuaded Alfred Apaka to record on his label, with Aku backing him on violin. Aku also recorded himself singing and playing violin on "My Little Buckaroo," among other tunes.

=== Radio Luxembourg ===
Never one to stay still, Aku began jumping from station to station in Hawaii and in the process he built up a following. In 1955 he showed up in London, England at the offices of the Radio Luxembourg programme listings magazine called 208. Aku asked to speak to the station management and he made a proposal to buy the morning time slot from 6 AM to 9 AM in order to present his own breakfast show. Unfortunately the transmitter which was located in the Grand Duchy of Luxembourg was only capable of reaching the British Isles in strength during the evening hours and his proposal was rejected.

== KORL 650AM, Honolulu ==
(The old KPOA) Aku broadcast from the "Tree House" at the International Market Place at Waikiki in the early 1960s.

== KGU 760AM, Honolulu ==
Aku's broadcast home for several years was the top of the Advertiser Newspaper building in downtown Honolulu until he moved back to KGMB. At one time, one of the twin towers on roof of the Advertiser building had the KGU call letters in four foot neon lights. Aku had this changed to AKU in neon lights for several months.

== KGMB, Honolulu ==
In 1965, Aku eventually managed to return to KGMB in Honolulu where his career had begun and where it blossomed as their morning show presenter.

When Mayor Frank Fasi forbid Star-Bulletin reporter Richard Borreca to attend his press conferences, the newspaper sued and the case was heard by federal judge Sam King who ruled that the mayor's action was unconstitutional. When King lost his race for governor, Fasi personally attacked him. Aku invited them to appear together on his popular morning radio program, where King attacked back. King later observed that he and Frank Fasi didn't bear each other any real enmity, but that Aku had gotten his show a ratings boost.

Aku was thought to be charming and contrary at the same time. He is reported to have become the world's highest paid deejay while barely managing to avoid bankruptcy several times. His on-air presence was calm but his off-air presence was obnoxious. While others would spin rock 'n' roll records Aku played up beat music from the 1940s. In addition to his other traits, Aku was a prankster who caused thousands to show up for a non-existent parade one April Fools' Day. But while he loved to create havoc, he had a thin skin for critical press reviews, and while others saw him as an entertainer, he saw himself as a journalist. Aku would also read the news during his morning show. This "Coconut Wireless News" segment would start off with a jingle that included sounds of coconut shell effects.

== Personal life and legacy ==
In 1968, Aku married Hawaiian singer Emma Veary.

Aku died on July 21, 1983, but managed to get the last laugh on the airwaves when he unleashed his own recorded announcements to stimulate a public mourning for his passing. A new era of radio was ushered into Hawaii following his death. Michael Perry and Larry Price replaced the late Aku and Hawaii finally adopted the morning team radio format already popular in the mainland United States. The "Coconut Wireless News" continues on the Perry and Price Show as a ten minute long newscast that has commentary and opinions included in the broadcast.
