= KSSK-FM =

Simulcasts KSSK, Honolulu
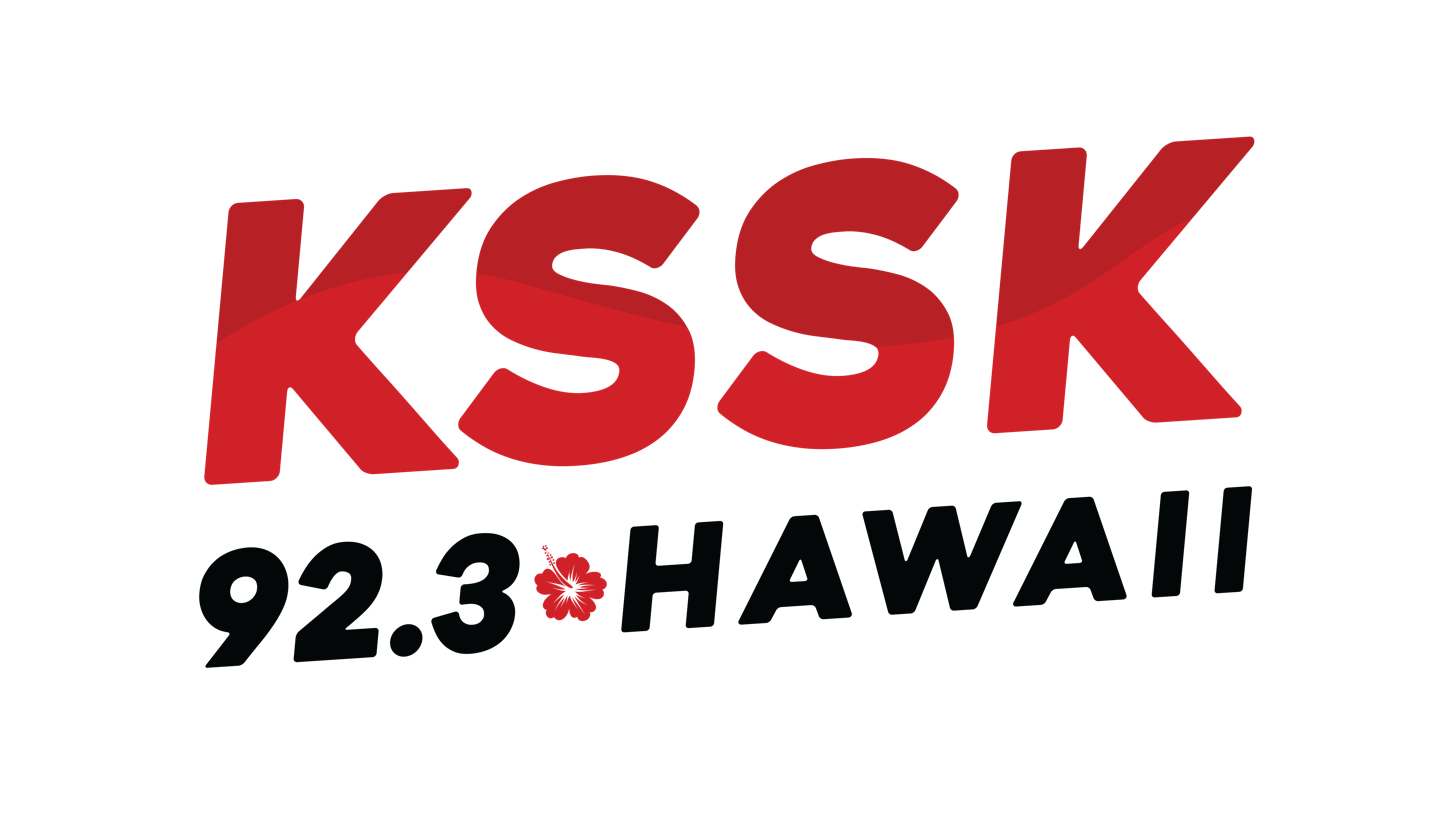
- Waipahu, Hawaii; United States
- Broadcast area: Honolulu, Hawaii
- Frequency: 92.3 MHz (HD Radio)
- Branding: AM 590 & 92.3 KSSK

Programming
- Format: Adult contemporary
- Subchannels: HD2: Country music

Ownership
- Owner: iHeartMedia, Inc.; (iHM Licenses, LLC)
- Sister stations: KDNN; KHVH; KIKI; KSSK; KUBT; KUCD; K256AS

History
- First air date: December 30, 1976
- Former call signs: KULA (1976–1987); KXPW (1987–1989)
- Call sign meaning: Phonetically similar to "kiss"

Technical information
- Licensing authority: FCC
- Facility ID: 48775
- Class: C
- ERP: 100,000 watts
- HAAT: 594 meters (1,949 ft)
- Transmitter coordinates: 21°23′49″N 158°5′58″W

Links
- Public license information: Public file; LMS
- Webcast: Listen live (via iHeartRadio); HD2: Listen live (via iHeartRadio)
- Website: ksskradio.iheart.com

KSSK-FM (92.3 FM) is a radio station licensed to Waipahu, Hawaii, United States, and serving Honolulu metropolitan area. Owned by iHeartMedia, it carries an adult contemporary format, with studios in the Kalihi neighborhood of Honolulu and transmitter sited near Akupu, Hawaii.

In addition to a standard analog transmission, KSSK-FM broadcasts in HD Radio, is simulcast over KSSK (590 AM) in Honolulu, and is available online via iHeartRadio.

== History ==
KSSK-FM was originally licensed with the call letters KULA on 92.9 MHz, and made its debut broadcast on December 30, 1976. At the time it was the sister station to KAHU (940 AM, later KKNE). KULA began as an automated station playing contemporary hit radio music provided by TM Programming. Its daily operations were run by one of its only two employees: Kawika Maszak, who programmed the automation computer to play commercial breaks.

In 1979, Heftel Broadcasting purchased KULA, pairing it with KSSK, which Heftel had owned since 1965. The company was owned by Cecil Heftel, a Hawaii businessman and one-time congressman. Heftel moved the station's studios to Honolulu and ended the automation, hiring a staff of DJs. The format later switched to soft adult contemporary using the slogan "Light Rock, Less Talk". In the late 1980s, KULA moved back to Top 40, becoming KXPW ("Power 92"), under long time Top 40 programmer Jay Stone. KXPW later re-branded to "92X", with initially Dean Stevens, and later, Brad Barrett as program director.

In 1993, New-Tex Communications bought both KSSK and KXPW for $7.5 million, and changed KXPW's call letters to KSSK-FM. At the time, the AM station was the market's #1 rated station, and the new owners wanted to capitalize on that success, especially as music listening was shifting to FM. The station moved back to an adult contemporary format, and began simulcasting part of the day with KSSK, including the top-rated "Perry & Price" morning show. Eventually, the simulcast was expanded to a 24-hour operation.

In 2000, Clear Channel Communications acquired KSSK-AM-FM. In 2014, the company was renamed iHeartMedia, Inc.

== Programming ==
KSSK AM and FM are home to the popular "Perry & the Posse" morning show. The station is heard world-wide on the free iHeartRadio app They are also heard on Oceanic Spectrum digital channel 867 for the entire state of Hawaii, via the DishHD satellite TV service in Taiwan, and also USEN's Sound Planet satellite radio service in Japan.

The station uses the slogan "Hawaii's Feel Good Favorites of Yesterday & Today". Nielsen consistently ranks KSSK-AM-FM as Honolulu's most listened-to radio station. A 2022 Inside Radio article named KSSK as the highest-rated AC Radio station in markets 51-100 KSSK's former jingle melody was adapted from that of WPLJ in New York City. KSSK-AM-FM used WPLJ's jingle packages until TM Century created a jingle package for KSSK, known as "Big Time Honolulu." In recent years, KSSK has converted to the KOST AC package from Reelworld.

In 2016, the KSSK Perry & Price morning show evolved to become Perry & the Posse in the wake of Larry Price's retirement. Michael W. Perry hosts the show with a cast that includes Jimmy "Da Geek" Bender, Sweetie Pacarro and Julia Norton-Dennis. Many of the long running features continue including On the Road with Mike Evans, The Real Jimmy Hollywood and the infamous Coconut Wireless News & Comment.

KSSK continues to serve the community as the primary civil defense radio station for the state of Hawaii. KSSK helps various causes and has most notably raised millions of dollars for the Kapiolani Medical Center for Women and Children through their annual Radiothon for Kids

== Notable former on-air staff ==
Some notables who have passed through KGMB/KSSK include:

- Earl McDaniel (General Manager credited with putting the station on top)
- Hal Aku Lewis (deceased)
- George "Granny Goose" Groves
- Don Lamons
- Dave Lancaster
- Susan Cruz (who was actually Noland Cruz though while on air as Susan Cruz, he was never a female impersonator. The only link to being female was his name that was given to him by the General Manager)
- Ruth Ann "Hana Ogi" Ogata
- Shawn Sweeny
- Cliff Richards (deceased)
- Myk Prosatiowell
- Mike Murray
- Harvey Weinstein (deceased)
- Kimo Kahoano
- Jim Peters
- Jim Collins
- Shawnee (Smith)
- Noel Grey
- Terry Rosati (News)
- Alan Zukercorn
- Dean Stevens (Program Director)
- Wild Bill Logan
- Steve Carpenter
- Michael Shishido
- Maxwell the night guy (Kris Sereno)
- Erika Engle (news)
- Dave Curtis (news)
- Maureen Borromeo (Pescaia)-(news)
- Brad Barrett, Director of Programming
- Dick Wainwright
- Denny McPhee
- Jim Erickson
- Lisa D
- Steve Kelly
- Jim Parker
- Skip Baszler
- Jessica Bailey (Evening and Weekend news anchor in the early 90s)
- Mike Tabura
- Larry Price
- Steve Clark
- Kathy with a K
