= Kalihi =

Neighborhood in Honolulu, Hawaii, US

Kalihi is a neighborhood of Honolulu on the island of Oʻahu in Hawaiʻi, United States. Split by Likelike Highway (Route 63), it is flanked by Liliha, Chinatown, and Downtown Honolulu to the east and Mapunapuna, Moanalua, and Salt Lake to the west.

Kalihi is the name of the ahupuaʻa (ancient land division) between Kahauiki and Kapālama in the Kona (now Honolulu) district of Oʻahu. The ahupuaʻa consists of Kalihi Uka, Kalihi Waena, and Kalihi Kai. Historically, Kalihi Kai was the site of the former Leprosy Receiving Station, where those suspected of leprosy were examined prior to treatment or being sent to Kalaupapa on the island of Molokaʻi. Kalihi was also known for its fishponds – ʻĀpili, Pahouiki, Pahounui, ʻAuiki, and Ananoho – near the present Sand Island Access Road (Route 64) which have since all been filled in. The harbormaster of Kamehameha I, Captain Alexander Adams, maintained a residence near the ʻĀpili pond.

The neighborhood's name comes from ka lihi which means "the edge" in the Hawaiian language, and was used for districts on other islands as well. Located at 21°20′10″N 157°52′35″W, it was thought to be named by Prince Lot (the future King Kamehameha V) in 1856.

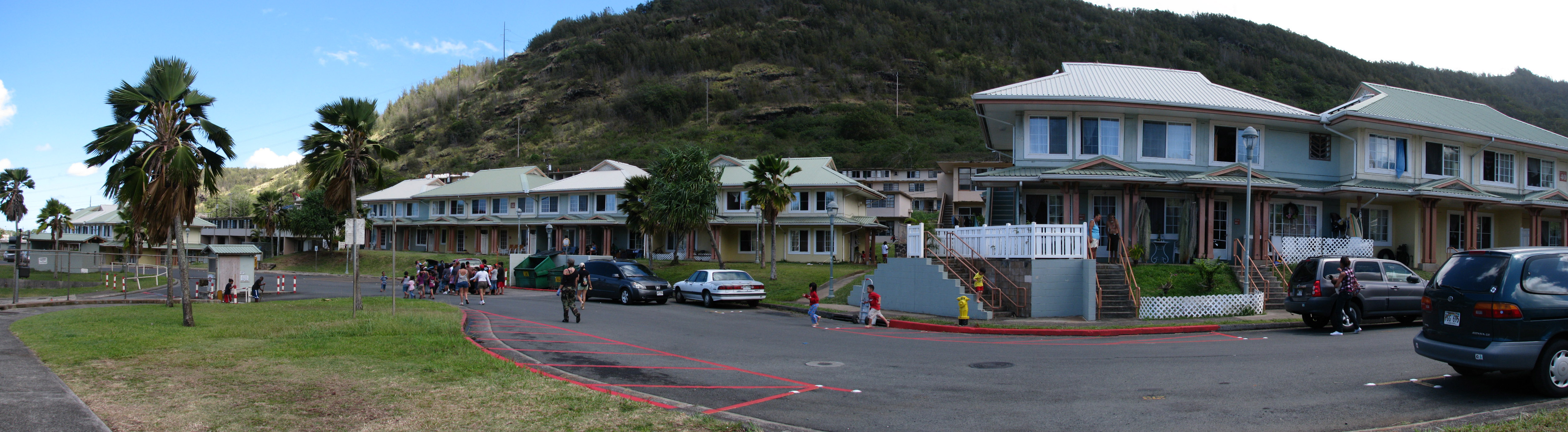
A community in Kalihi.

Kalihi Valley has been carved by Kalihi Stream; it is narrow and steep in its upper reaches (with source around 21°22′29″N 157°48′55″W, but widens out to flatlands as it approaches Honolulu Harbor, with its mouth at 21°19′51″N 157°53′26″W.

The lower valley has been a residential area for a considerable time and is home to numerous tracts of older houses. It becomes commercial and maritime close to the water.

Kalihi is famous for being the residence of Pele's family, including her sister, mother, and the wife of Wakea.

Historically, Kalihi is an ahupuaʻa, or area of land ruled by chief or king and managed by the members of the ʻaliʻi

== Government and infrastructure ==
The Hawaii Department of Public Safety operates the Oahu Community Correctional Center (OCC), the sole short-term incarceration and pretrial jail, on a 16-acre (6.5 ha) plot in Kalihi.

== Education ==
The Hawaii Department of Education operates public schools in the area, including Kalihi Elementary, Kalihi Waena Elementary, Kalihi Uka Elementary, Kalihi Kai Elementary, Dole Middle School, Kapalama Elementary School, King David Kalakaua Middle School, and Farrington High School. At the southern edge of the district lie the private Damien Memorial School and Kamehameha Schools campuses and the Bernice P. Bishop Museum.

== People ==
- Tulsi Gabbard, politician
- Sonny Ganaden, politician
- Mufi Hannemann, politician and businessman
- Marist Liufau, American football player
- The Brothers Cazimero, music duo
- Guy Kawasaki, American marketing specialist, author, and Silicon Valley venture capitalist
