= KVOK =

KVOK may refer to:

- KVOK-FM, a radio station (101.1 FM) licensed to Kodiak, Alaska, United States
- KVOK (AM), a defunct radio station (560 AM) formerly licensed to Kodiak, Alaska
- KVOK-FM (Hawaii), a defunct radio station, the first FM station in Hawaii, United States
- the ICAO code for Volk Field Air National Guard Base
