= KVOK-FM (Hawaii) =

Radio station in Honolulu, Hawai'i (1953–1965)

Honolulu, Hawaii; United States
- Frequency: 88.1 MHz

Programming
- Format: Defunct

Ownership
- Owner: Kamehameha Schools

History
- First air date: October 6, 1953
- Last air date: 1965
- Call sign meaning: Voice of Kamehameha

Technical information
- ERP: 10 watts

KVOK-FM (88.1 FM) was the first FM radio station in Hawai‘i. The 10-watt station was operated by Kamehameha Schools Kapālama Campus, between 1953 and 1965.

== History ==
Governor Samuel Wilder King spoke during the inaugural broadcast on October 6, 1953, though it had been on air since August 19 of that year.

Hawai'i's first high-power commercial station, KAIM-FM, went on the air later that year. KVOK, short for Voices of Kamehameha, was a training station operated primarily by Kamehameha students. Programming was a combination of live broadcasts from the station's studios in Room 108 and 109 of Kōnia Hall, and taped performances from a variety of locations on campus. Live programming could also be transmitted from the schools' gymnasium, Kekūhaupi‘o, for special events such as the annual Song Contest. Broadcasts were primarily in the afternoon; transmission usually ended by 5:30 PM Hawai‘i time.

KVOK's studios were among the best in Hawai‘i at the time. Private companies, such as 49th State Recording Company, used the studio to record local Hawaiian artists such as Genoa Keawe.

In 1964, KVOK polled its listeners and found it only had three of them, prompting the school to announce it was considering closing down KVOK. The station shut down in 1965. The KVOK call letters were later assigned to an unrelated AM radio station, KVOK in Kodiak, Alaska in 1974, and have since been moved to an FM station in the same city.
