= Earl Cunningham (disambiguation) =

Earl Cunningham (1893–1977) was an American folk artist.

Earl Cunningham may also refer to:

- USCGC Earl Cunningham, a Sentinel-class cutter
- Earl Cunningham (USCG), a U.S. Coast Guard hero, after whom USCGC Earl Cunningham is named
