= Kodiak National Wildlife Refuge =

National Wildlife Refuge in Alaska, US

- IUCN category IV (habitat/species management area)
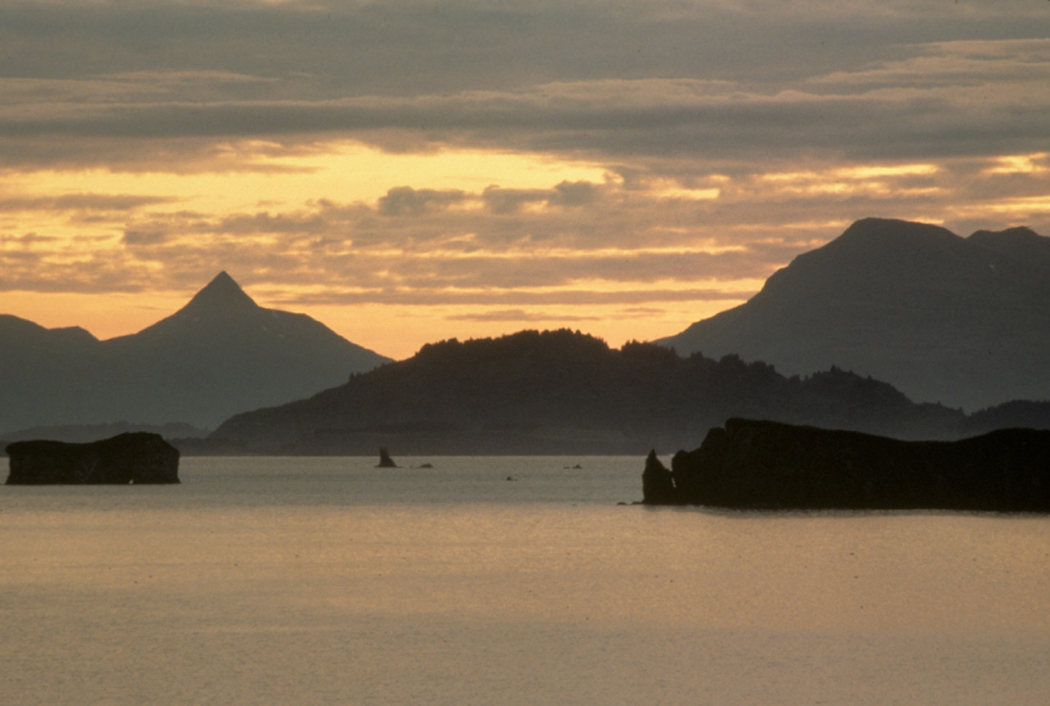
- Chiniak Bay, Kodiak National Wildlife Refuge

- Location within Alaska
- Location: Kodiak Island Borough, Alaska, United States
- Nearest city: Kodiak, Alaska
- Coordinates: 57°20′00″N 153°45′02″W
- Area: 1,990,418 acres (8,054.94 km^{2})
- Established: 1941
- Governing body: U.S. Fish and Wildlife Service
- Website: Kodiak NWR

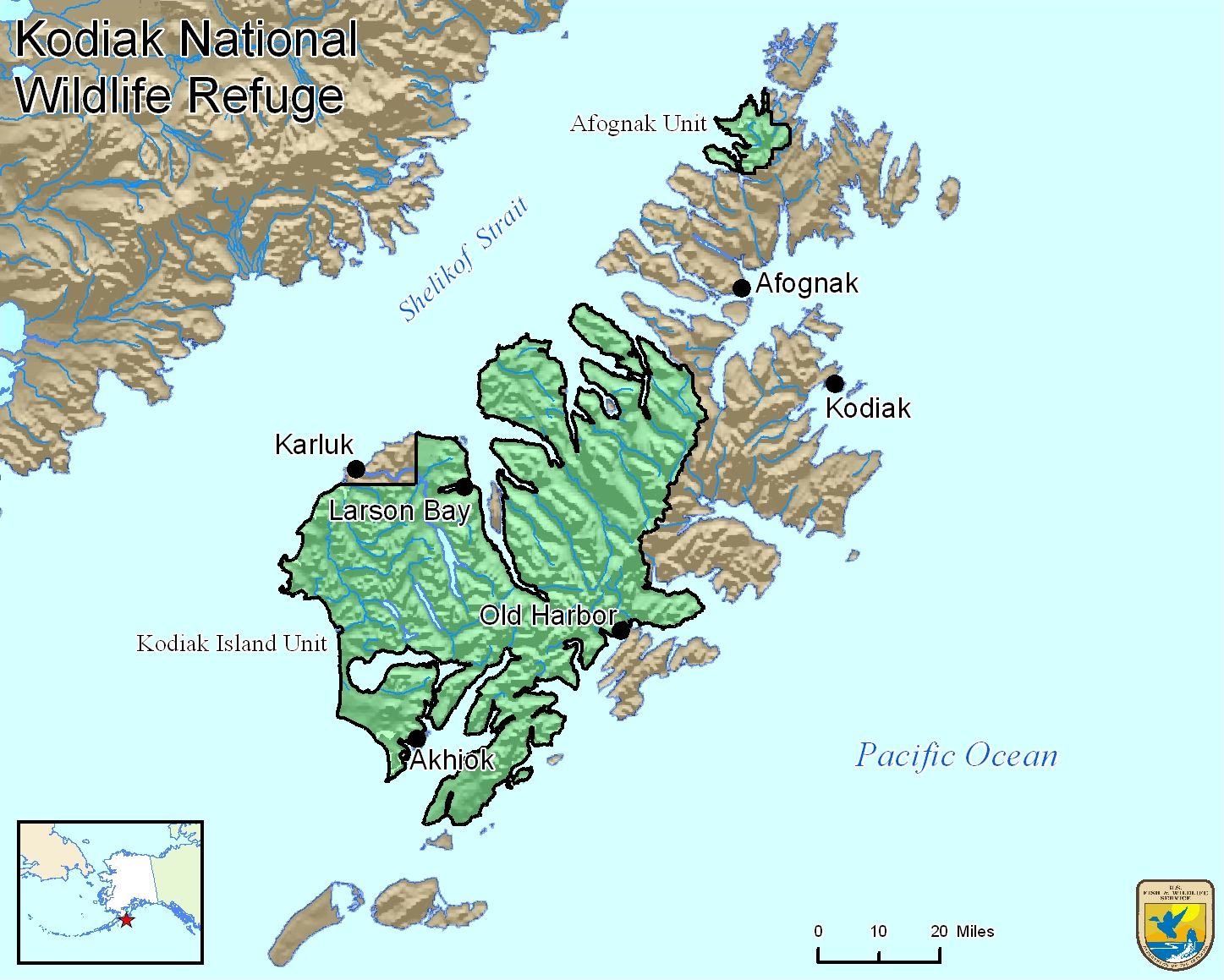
Map of Kodiak National Wildlife Refuge

The Kodiak National Wildlife Refuge is a United States National Wildlife Refuge in the Kodiak Archipelago in southwestern Alaska, United States.

== Description ==
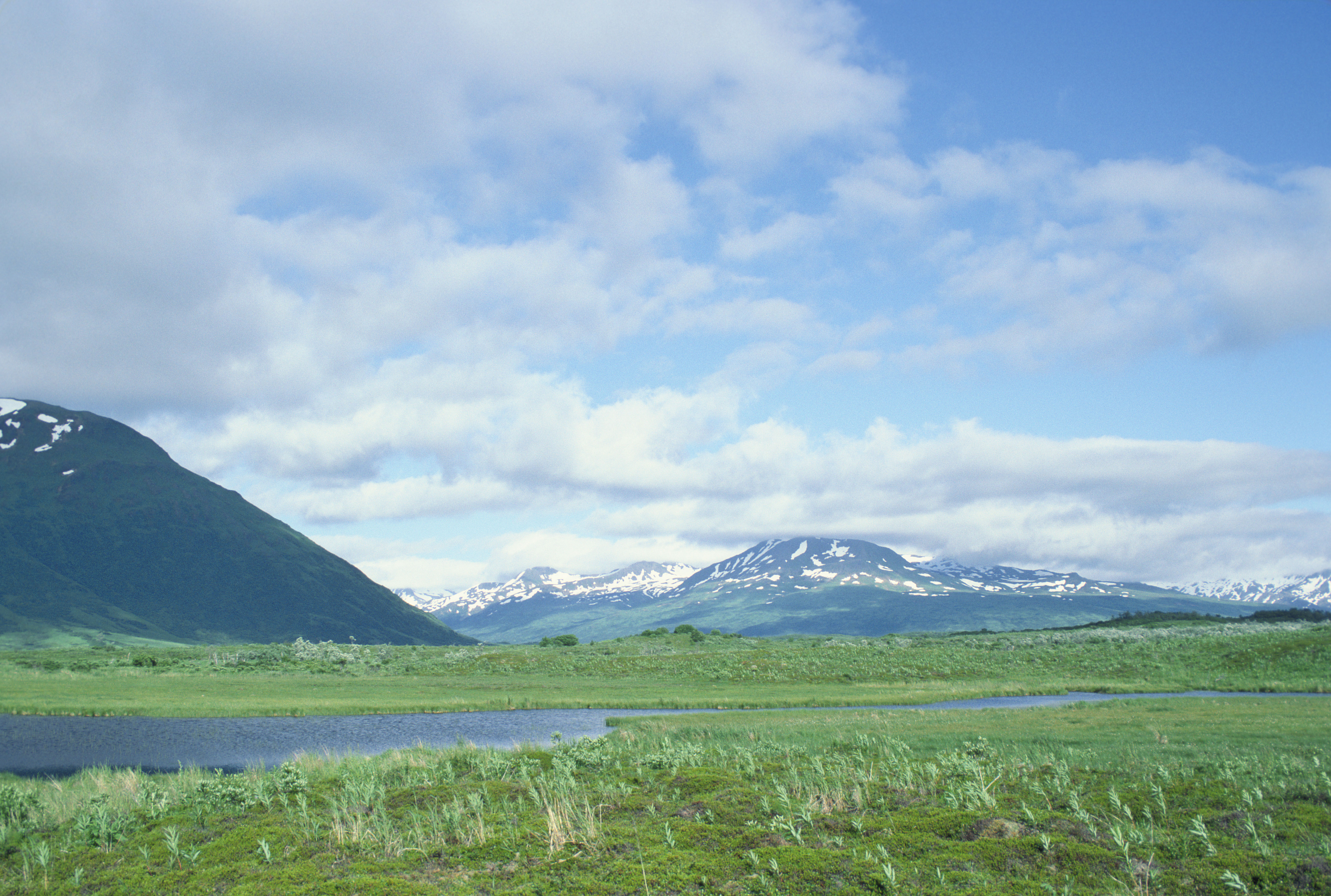
Scenery, Kodiak National Wildlife Refuge

The Kodiak National Wildlife Refuge includes the southwestern two-thirds of Kodiak Island, Uganik Island, the Red Peaks area of Afognak Island and all of Ban Island in the archipelago. It encompasses 1,990,418 acres (8,054.94 km^{2}). The refuge is administered from offices in Kodiak.

The refuge contains seven major rivers and about 100 streams. It is a spawning ground for all five species of Pacific Ocean salmon, steelhead, Dolly Varden, and several other fish species; as well as a nesting ground for 250 species of bird, many of which feed on salmon. The refuge has only six native species of mammals: Kodiak bear, red fox, river otter, ermine, little brown bat and tundra vole. The non-native mammals Sitka black-tailed deer, mountain goat, Roosevelt elk, caribou, marten, red squirrel, snowshoe hare, and beaver were introduced to the archipelago between the 1920s and 1950s and are now hunted and trapped. An estimated 2,300 brown bears inhabit the refuge, and an estimated 1200 bald eagles nest here every year.

The climate of the refuge is that of southern Alaska, mild and rainy. Many areas in the refuge are densely forested with Sitka spruce at lower elevations. There are grasslands in drier areas, shrub habitats dominated by dense alder, and alpine habitats at higher elevations. The refuge contains several small glaciers.

The refuge has no road access from the outside but contains part of a private road used for access to the Terror Lake hydroelectric facility. Public use of this road is prohibited.

== See also ==
- List of largest National Wildlife Refuges
