= Terror Lake Hydroelectric Generating Station =

Principal power plant for Kodiak Island, Alaska

Coordinates: 57°41′09″N 152°53′42″W

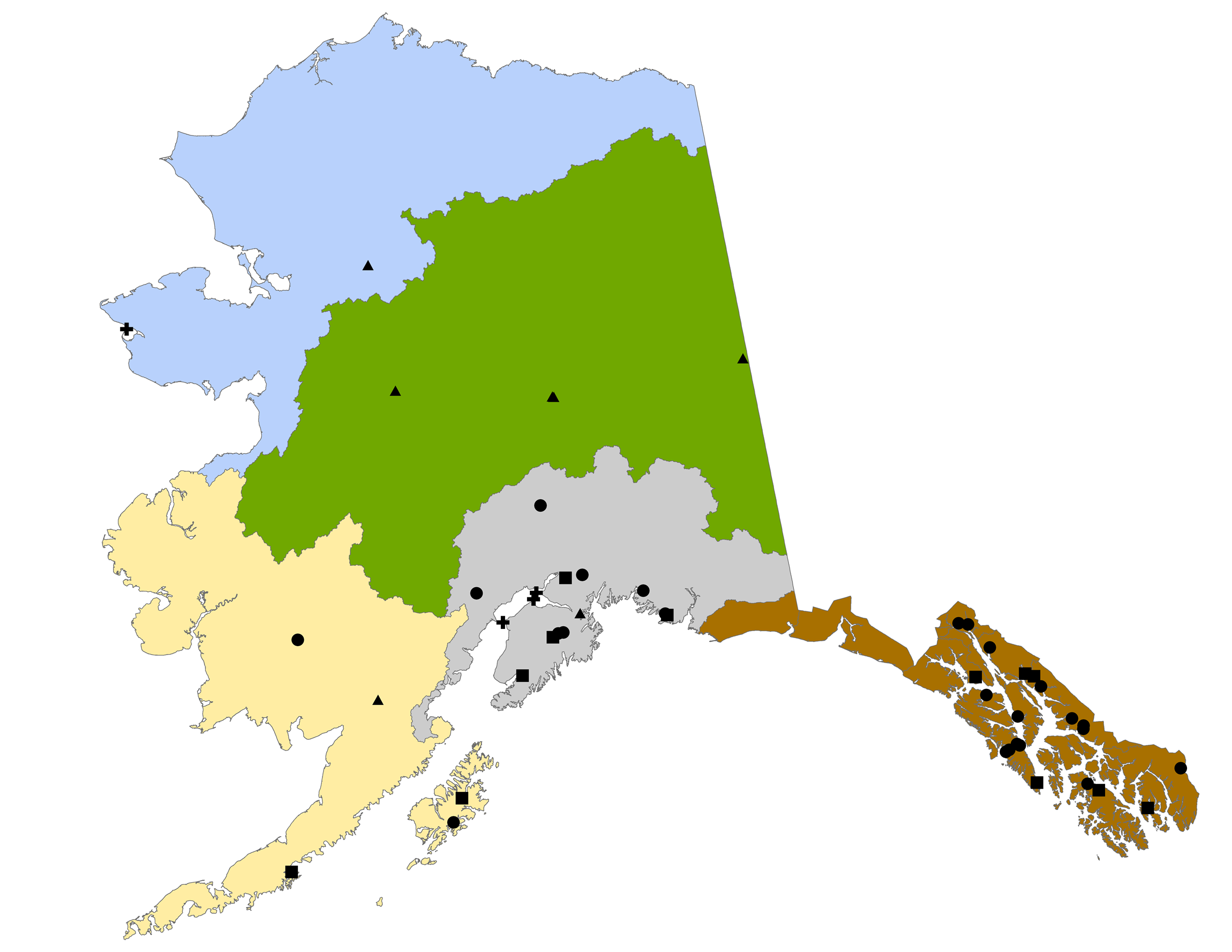
The location of the Terror Lake project is given by the black square on Kodiak Island.

The Terror Lake Hydroelectric Generating Station is the principal power plant for Kodiak Island, Alaska. The Hydroelectricity station consists of three Pelton runner vertical shaft turbine units rated 11 megawatts each at 1200 feet head. Two units were installed when the station was constructed in 1985, and the third unit rated 11.5 MW was installed in the fall of 2013. The station is owned and operated by the Kodiak Electric Association, Inc., an electrical cooperative owned by its customers. The station is located about 25 miles from the city of Kodiak and is accessible only by air or boat.

The Terror Lake main dam is 2100 feet long and 156 feet high and is a rockfill dam faced with concrete. A spillway with a 600-foot crest is adjacent to the north side of the dam. The lake acts as a reservoir with a surface area of 850 acres. It can store 78,000 acre-feet of water at a lake surface elevation of 1383 feet. The power tunnel is 10 feet in diameter and extends 26,300 feet from the dam to the penstock, from an inlet 143 feet below the nominal surface of the lake. The penstock that connects the power tunnel to the powerhouse is steel-lined and runs for 3,400 feet, varying from 56 to 96 inches in diameter. The station discharges water to the Kizhuyak River. Other civil works for the project include several dikes, smaller dams and diversion channels to collect water into the lake. A 17-mile private road was built between the barge landing site at the head of Kizhuyak Bay to the powerhouse. Major equipment and materials arrive by landing craft at the beach, and then are hauled up the private road. A 17-mile transmission line energized at 138 kV connects the switchyard near the powerhouse to the substation at the City of Kodiak. The project was initially constructed by the State of Alaska for US$230,000,000 in 1985.

The project was licensed in 1981 for a term of 50 years. The project is located within the Kodiak National Wildlife Refuge; environmental studies were carried out before construction, to evaluate impact on the Kodiak bear.

Principal loads for the utility are the city of Kodiak, Alaska (and adjacent unincorporated suburbs), and the U.S. Coast Guard base (and adjacent Kodiak Airport). The hydroelectric plant replaced earlier diesel engine generators, which are now used only for peak loads during the fish canning season. Kodiak Electric also operates six 1.5 MW wind turbines. Since the network is isolated from the North American grid, a 3 megawatt battery bank was also purchased to help stabilize system frequency on sudden changes of load or sudden shifts in wind. It is the stated objective of the Kodiak co-op to obtain 95% of their electrical energy from renewable sources by 2020. The low cost of power generated by Terror Lake has stabilized the electrical rates for the city of Kodiak, since this displaces most of the oil that would otherwise be consumed by diesel generator sets.
