= USCGC Earl Cunningham =

US Coast Guard Cutter WPC-1159

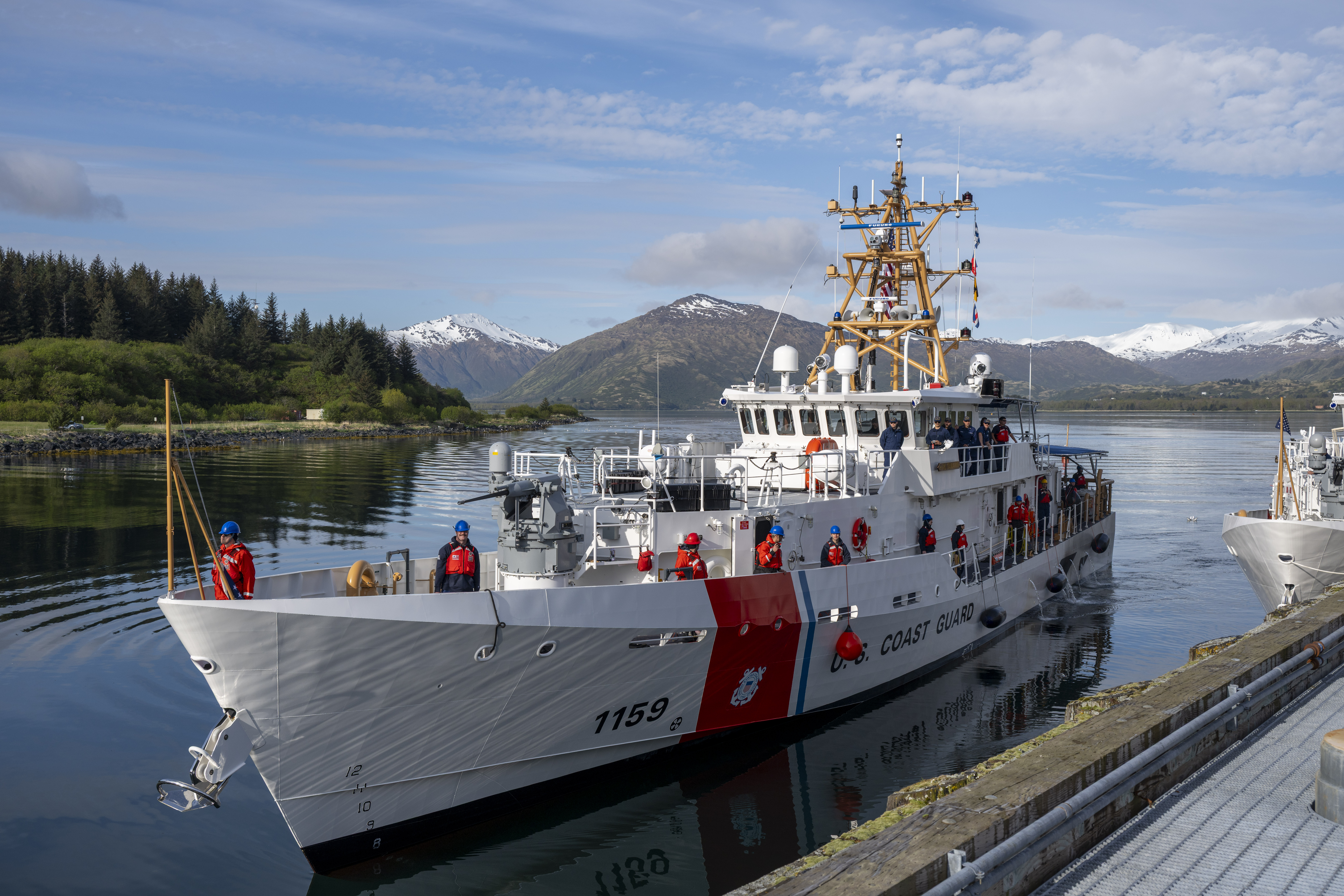
- USCGC Earl Cunningham arriving at Coast Guard Base Kodiak

History

United States
- Name: Earl Cunningham
- Namesake: Earl Cunningham
- Operator: United States Coast Guard
- Builder: Bollinger Shipyards, Lockport, Louisiana
- Acquired: 2025-03-06
- Commissioned: 2025-08-11
- Home port: Kodiak, Alaska
- Identification: Call Sign NELC; MMSI number: 338926459
- Motto: If Not Us Then Who
- Status: in active service
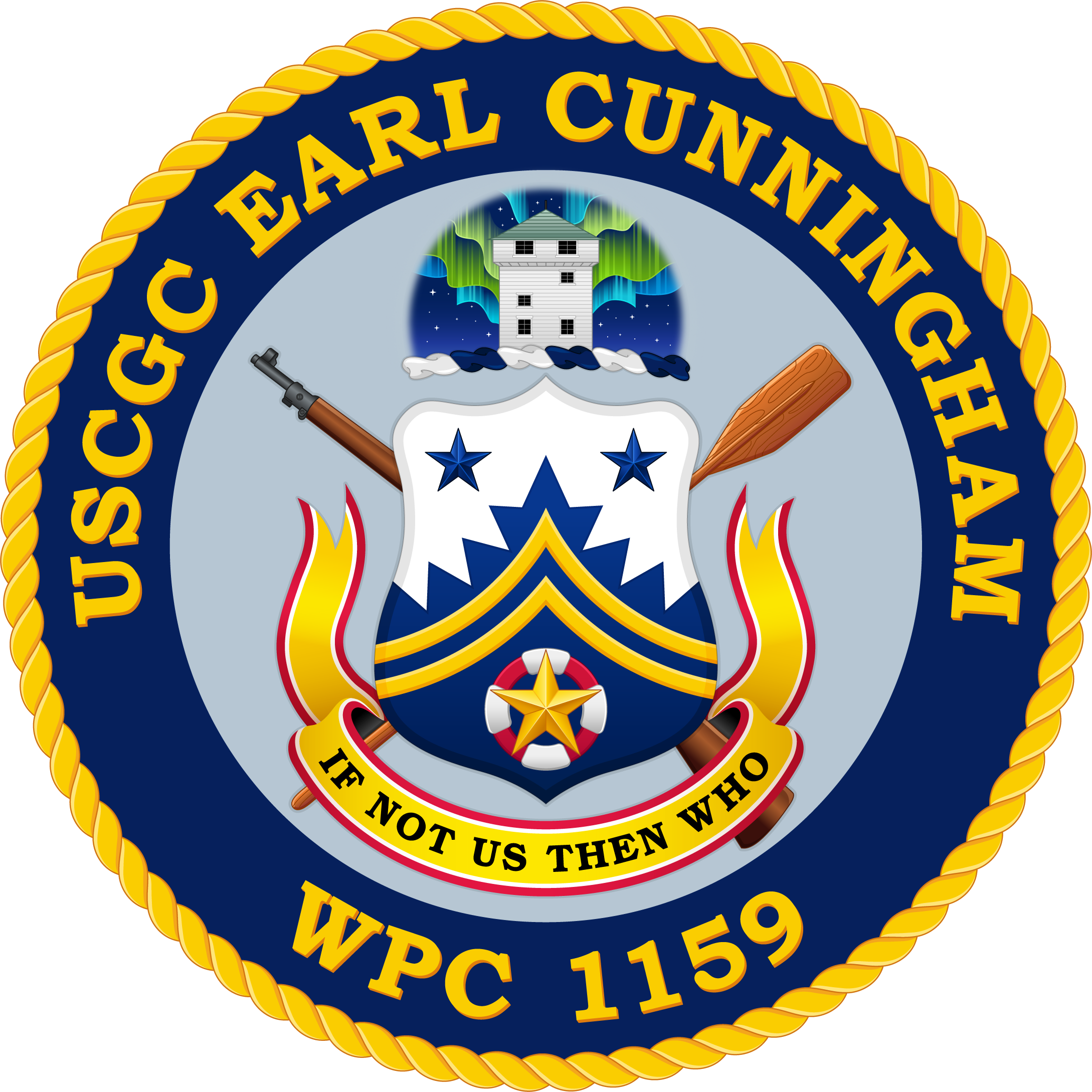
- Badge

General characteristics
- Class & type: Sentinel-class cutter
- Displacement: 353 long tons (359 t)
- Length: 153.5 ft (46.8 m)
- Beam: 25.43 ft (7.75 m)
- Draft: 8.46 ft (2.58 m)
- Propulsion: 2 × 4,300 kW (5,800 shp); 1 × 75 kW (101 shp) bow thruster
- Speed: 28 knots (52 km/h; 32 mph)
- Range: 2,500 nautical miles (4,600 km; 2,900 mi)
- Endurance: 5 days
- Boats & landing craft carried: 1 × Over the Horizon cutter boat
- Complement: 4 officers, 20 crew
- Armament: 1 × Mk 38 25 mm autocannon; 4 × crew-served Browning M2 machine guns

USCGC Earl Cunningham (WPC-1159) is the United States Coast Guard's 59th Sentinel-class cutter. She supports multiple Coast Guard missions including port, waterway and coastal security, fishery patrols, drug and illegal immigrant law enforcement, search and rescue, and national defense operations. She was commissioned on August 11, 2025. The ship is based in Kodiak, Alaska.

== Namesake ==
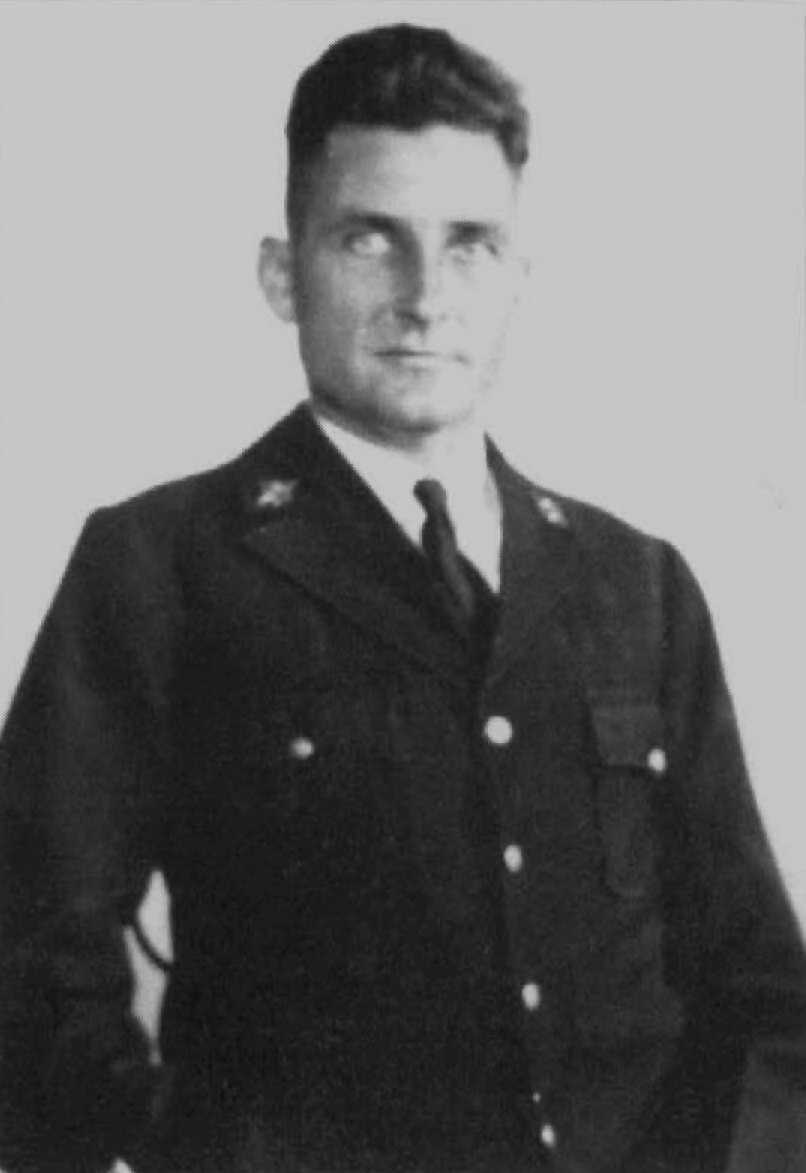
Earl Cunningham, the ship's namesake

Each cutter in the Sentinel class is named after an enlisted hero. The ship's namesake is Earl Cunningham, an off-duty Coast Guardsman who gave his life trying to rescue stranded mariners in Lake Michigan.

== Construction and characteristics ==
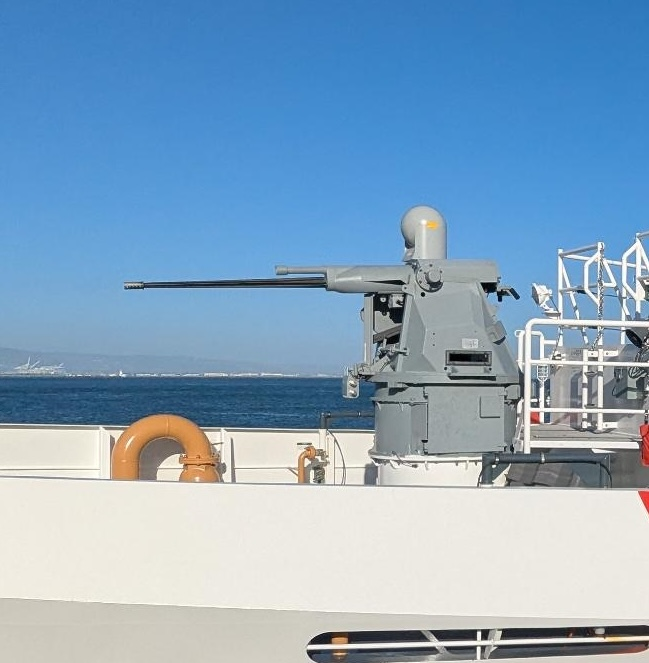
Mk 38 25mm autocannon on Earl Cunningham

The Coast Guard's Island-class cutters were launched between 1986 and 1992. On 26 September 2008 the Coast Guard awarded a contract to Bollinger Shipyards for the lead ship in the Sentinel class which would replace the aging Island class. This contract included options to build an additional 33 ships. The Coast Guard exercised all the options and, in May 2016, awarded Bollinger a new contract with options for 26 more of the cutters, including Earl Cunningham. The average cost of the ships under contract at that point was approximately $65 million.

Earl Cunningham was built by Bollinger Shipyards in Lockport, Louisiana. On 6 March 2025, she was delivered to the Coast Guard at Key West, Florida.

Earl Cunningham is 153.5 feet (46.8 m) long, with a beam of 25.43 feet (7.75 m), and a full-load draft of 8.46 feet (2.58 m). She displaces 353 tons when fully loaded. Her hull is built of welded steel plates, while her superstructure is made of aluminum.

The ship is propelled by two Tier II 20-cylinder mtu 20 V 4000 M93L Diesel engines which produce 5,676 horsepower each. These drive two six-bladed fixed-pitch propellers. This propulsion package gives her a continuous cruising speed of 28 knots. Her fuel tanks hold over 17,000 US gallons (64,000 L) giving Earl Cunningham an unrefueled range of 2,500 nautical miles at 15 knots. The ship is equipped with a Schottel STT 60K bow thruster.

Electrical power aboard is provided by two main ship-service generators and an emergency generator. The two ship service generators are Cummins QSM-11-DM Diesel engines driving Stanford 317 Kw generators. The emergency unit, which is housed in a separate room, is a Cummins 6BTA5.9-DM Diesel engine driving a Stanford 93 Kw generator.

The ship is equipped with Quantum QC1500 fin stabilizers to reduce rolling. Potable water can be produced from seawater with an onboard desalination plant. Satellite television is available in the crew mess area.

She is armed with a remotely-controlled, gyro-stabilized Mark 38 25 mm autocannon, four crew served M2 Browning machine guns, and light arms.

Earl Cunningham, like all the Sentinel-class cutters, is equipped with a stern launching ramp, that allows her to launch and retrieve a 26 feet (7.9 m)-long Over-the-Horizon cutter boat without first coming to a stop. Her cutter boat is useful for inspecting other vessels, and deploying boarding parties. As its top speed is 40 knots, it can pursue vessels which attempt to flee. It is equipped with an inboard Diesel engine which propels the boat by a jet drive.

Earl Cunningham has a crew of 24 men and women. The Sentinel class was designed to accommodate mixed-gender crews, with small staterooms rather than large bunk rooms and individual heads. The captain and executive officer have private staterooms.
