= Kodiak, Alaska =

City in Alaska, United States

Kodiak Sun'aq (Alutiiq) Кадьяк (Russian)
- City
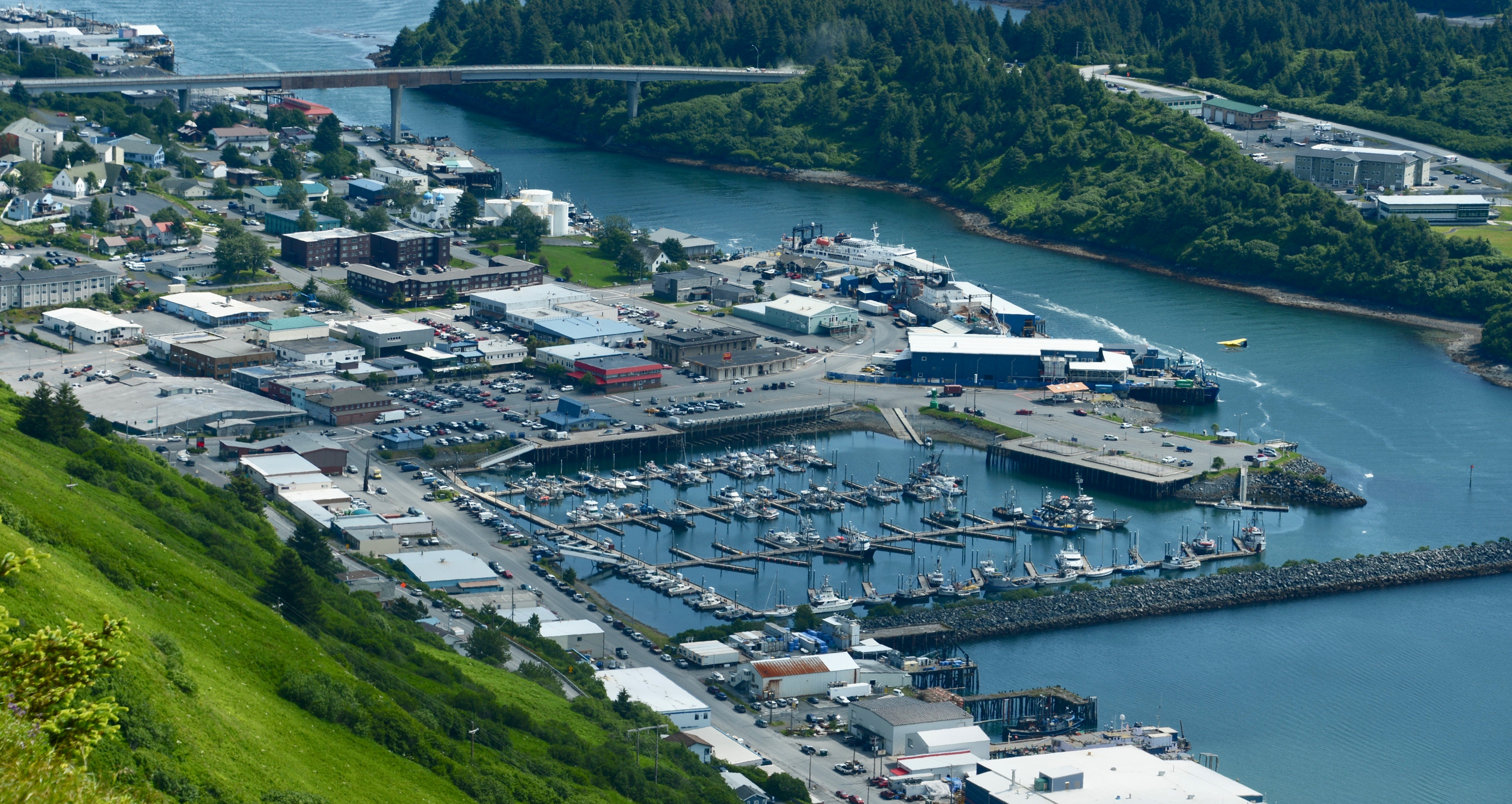
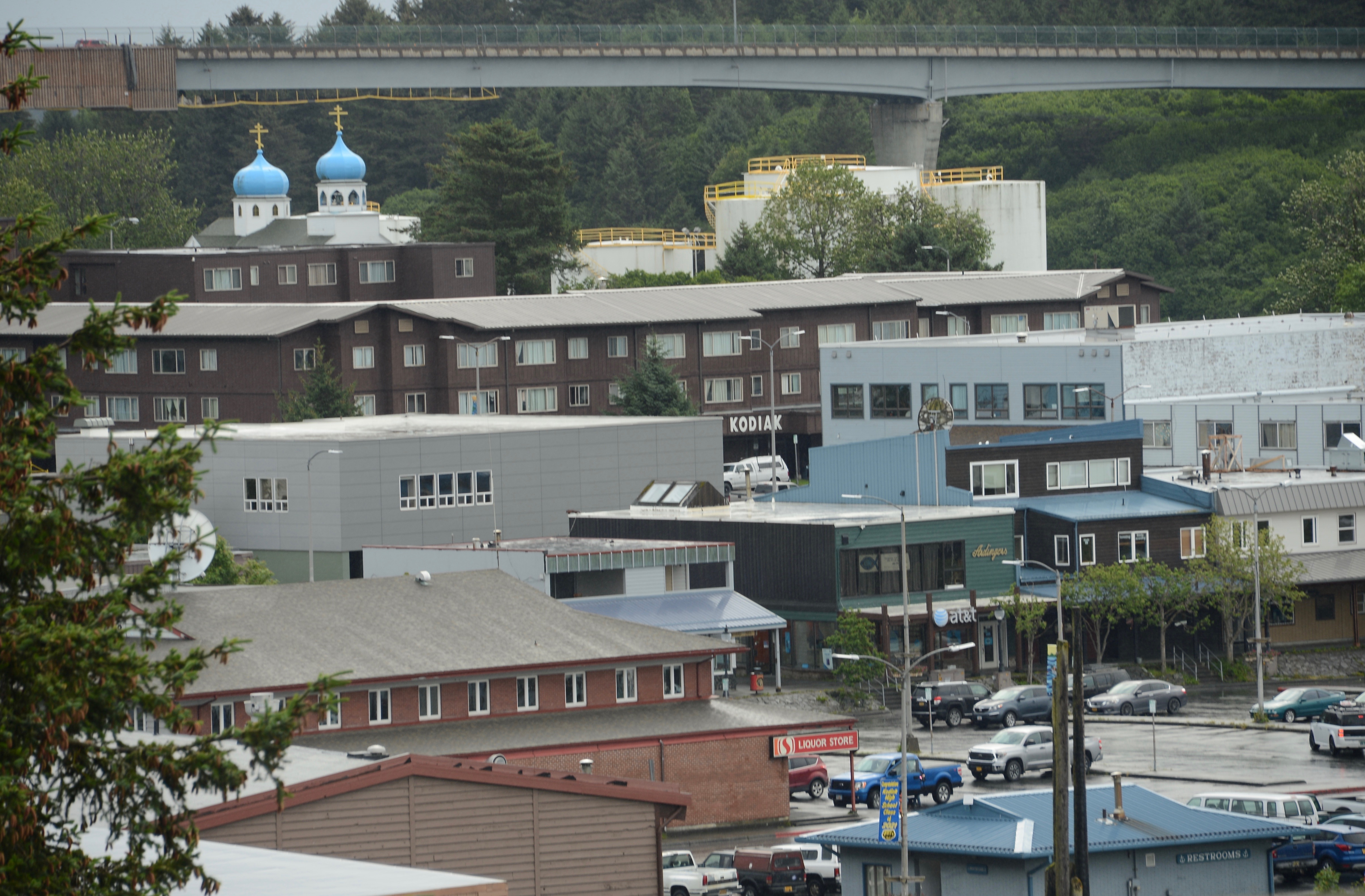
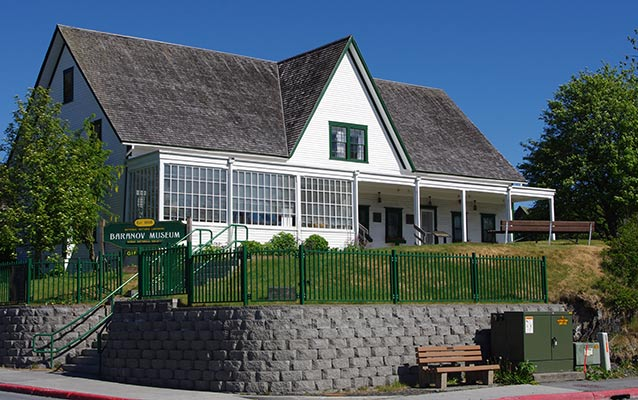
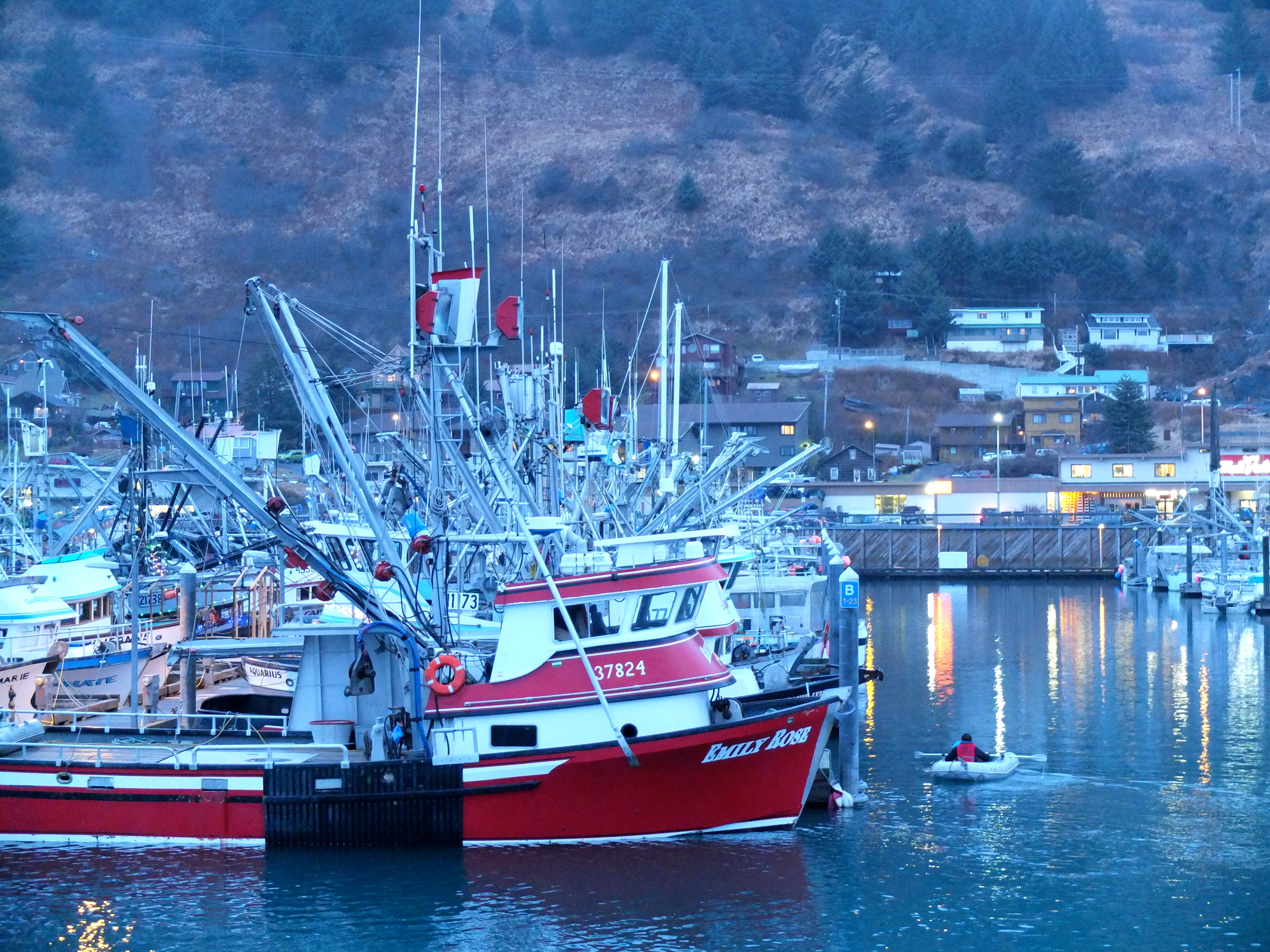
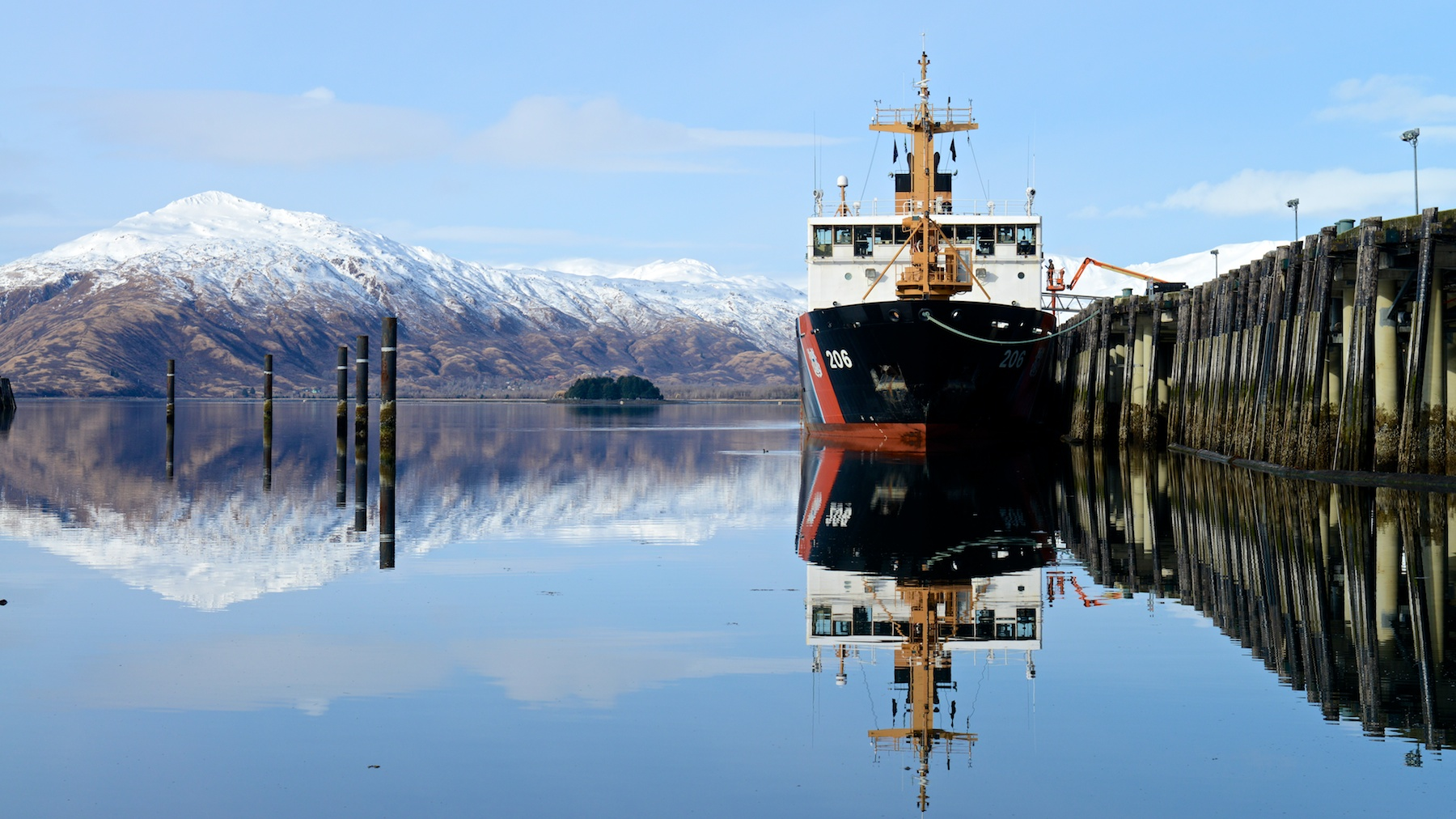
- View of Kodiak from Pillar Mountain Downtown in 2021 Kodiak History Museum Kodiak Harbor in 2014 The USCGC Spar at Coast Guard Base Kodiak

- Seal Logo
- Motto: "Alaska's Emerald Isle"
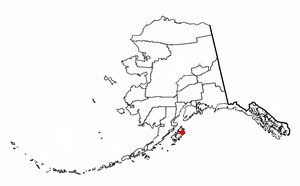
- Location in Alaska
- Coordinates: 57°47′35″N 152°23′39″W
- Country: United States
- State: Alaska
- Borough: Kodiak Island
- Incorporated: September 11, 1940

Government
  - Mayor: Terry J. Haines
  - State senator: Gary Stevens (R)
  - State rep.: Louise Stutes (R)

Area
  - Total: 5.49 sq mi (14.23 km^{2})
  - Land: 3.92 sq mi (10.16 km^{2})
  - Water: 1.57 sq mi (4.07 km^{2})
- Elevation: 49 ft (15 m)

Population (2020)
  - Total: 5,581
  - Density: 1,422.2/sq mi (549.11/km^{2})
- Time zone: UTC-9 (AKST)
  - Summer (DST): UTC-8 (AKDT)
- ZIP code: 99615, 99619, 99697
- Area code: 907
- FIPS code: 02-40950
- GNIS feature ID: 1404875
- Website: www.city.kodiak.ak.us

Kodiak (Alutiiq: Sun'aq; Russian: Кадьяк) is the main city and one of seven communities on Kodiak Island in Kodiak Island Borough, Alaska. All commercial transportation between the island's communities and the outside world goes through this city via ferryboat or airline. As of the 2020 census, the population of the city was 5,581, down from 6,130 in 2010. It is the tenth-largest city in Alaska.

Inhabited by Alutiiq Natives for more than 7,000 years, Kodiak was settled in 1792 by subjects of the Russian crown. Originally named Paul's Harbor, it was the capital of Russian Alaska. Russian harvesting of the area's sea otter pelts led to the near extinction of the animal in the following century and led to wars with and enslavement of the natives for over 150 years. The city has experienced two natural disasters in the 20th century: a volcanic ashfall from the 1912 eruption of Novarupta and a tsunami from the 1964 Alaska earthquake. Since the earthquake, Kodiak has been the headquarters of the Native Village of Afognak, an Alutiiq federally recognized Alaska Native tribe.

After the Alaska Purchase by the United States in 1867, Kodiak became a commercial fishing center which continues to be the mainstay of its economy. A lesser economic influence includes tourism, mainly by those seeking outdoor adventure trips. Salmon, halibut, the unique Kodiak bear, elk, Sitka deer (black tail), and mountain goats attract hunting tourists as well as fishermen to the Kodiak Archipelago. The Alaska Department of Fish and Game maintains an office in the city and a website to help hunters and fishermen obtain the proper permits and learn about the laws specific to the Kodiak area.

The city has four public elementary schools, a middle and high school, as well as a branch of the University of Alaska. An antenna farm at the summit of Pillar Mountain above the city historically provided communication with the outside world before fiber optic cable was run. Transportation to and from the island is provided by ferry service on the Alaska Marine Highway as well as local commercial airlines.

== History ==
=== Indigenous people ===
Archaeological evidence suggests that the Kodiak Archipelago has been home to the Alutiiq for at least 7,000 years. In their language, qikertaq means "island".

=== Russian control: 1700s–1867 ===
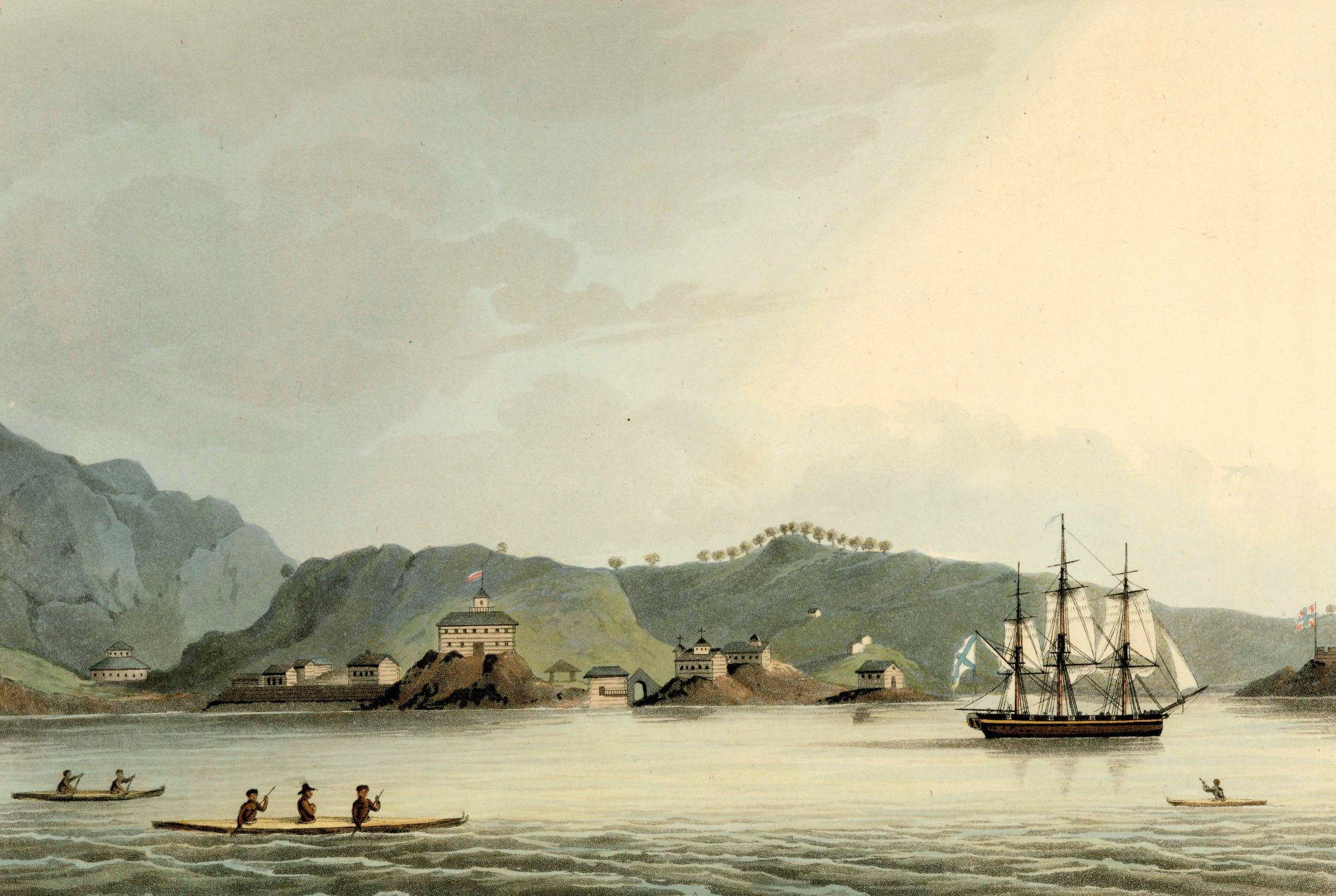
The Russian sloop of war Neva visits Kodiak, Alaska in 1805

The first Europeans to sight Kodiak Island were the explorers Vitus Bering and Aleksei Chirikov, during the 1741 Second Kamchatka Expedition. In the early 1750s the Russian fur trading merchant and explorer Stepan Glotov met a Kodiak Islander in the Aleutian Islands, who told him about the island. On his next voyage Glotov sailed to Kodiak Island, arriving in 1763. The Russians called the island Kad’yak (Кадьяк), after the Alutiiq word qikertaq. Several other Russians made fur hunting voyages to Kodiak Island in the 1770s. In 1778 the British captain James Cook explored the area and wrote of "Kodiak" in his journals. In 1779 the Spanish explorers Arteaga y Bazán and Bodega y Quadra reached Afognak in the Kodiak Archipelago.

In 1792, the Russian Shelikhov-Golikov Company chief manager Alexander Baranov moved the post at Three Saints Bay (established in 1784) to a new site in St. Paul's Harbor (Свято-Павловской гавани, Svyato-Pavlovskoy Gavani). This developed as the nucleus of modern Kodiak. Baranov considered Three Saints Bay a poor location because it was too indefensible. The relocated settlement was first named Pavlovskaya Gavan (Павловская гавань – Paul's Harbor).

A warehouse was built in what became one of the key posts of the Shelikhov-Golikov Company, a precursor of the Russian-American Company and a center for harvesting the area's vast population of sea otters for their prized pelts. The warehouse still stands as the Baranov Museum. Because the First Native cultures revered this animal and would never harm it, the Russians had wars with and enslaved the Aleuts during this era.

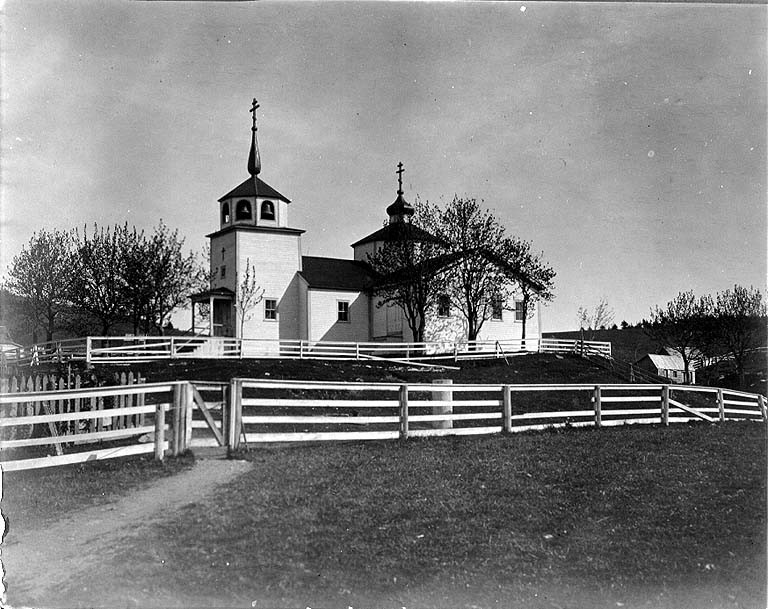
"Russian Church" photo by John Nathan Cobb, June 1908

Eastern Orthodox missionaries settled on the island by the end of the 18th century, continuing European settlement of the island. They held the liturgy in native Tlingit from 1800.

The capital of Russian America was moved to Novoarkhangelsk (modern-day Sitka) in 1804. The Russian-American Company was established in 1799 as a joint-stock company by decree of Emperor Paul to continue the harvest of sea otter and other fur-bearing animals and establish permanent settlements. By the mid-19th century, the sea otter was almost extinct and 85% of the First Native population had disappeared from exposure to European diseases.

=== American control: 1867–present ===
When Russia sold Alaska to the United States in 1867, Kodiak developed as a center for commercial fishing, and canneries dotted the island in the early 20th century until global farm-raised salmon eliminated these businesses. New processing centers emerged and the industry continues to evolve.

Kodiak was severely impacted by the 1912 eruption of Novarupta. Though situated 160 miles (260 km) southeast of the eruption center, the town was covered with 1 foot (30 cm) of ash over a short period of time. Townspeople sheltered in the U.S. Revenue Cutter Manning which was docked nearby.

As Kodiak was incorporated in 1941, the U.S. feared attack from Japanese during World War II, and turned the town into a fortress. Roads, the airport, Fort Abercrombie, and gun fortifications improved the island's infrastructure. When Alaska became a state in 1959, government assistance in housing, transportation, and education added additional benefits.

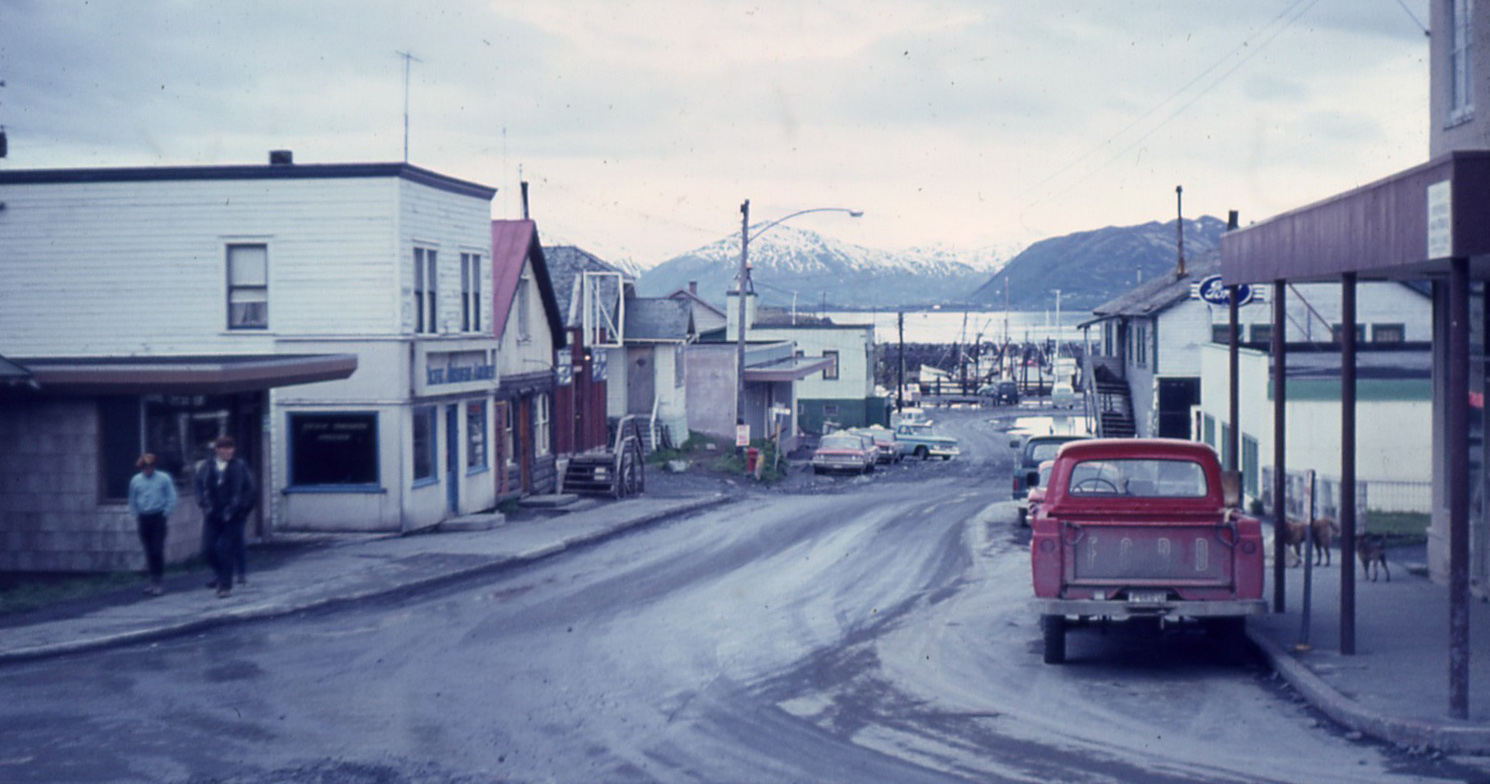
Street of Kodiak in 1965

In March 1964, a tectonic tsunami struck the city during the 1964 Alaska earthquake with 30-foot (9.1 m) waves that killed 15 people and caused $11 million in damage. Some areas near Kodiak were permanently raised by 30 feet (9.1 m). It wiped out the neighboring Native villages of Old Harbor and Kaguyak. The Standard Oil Company, the Alaskan King Crab Company, and much of the fishing fleet were also destroyed.

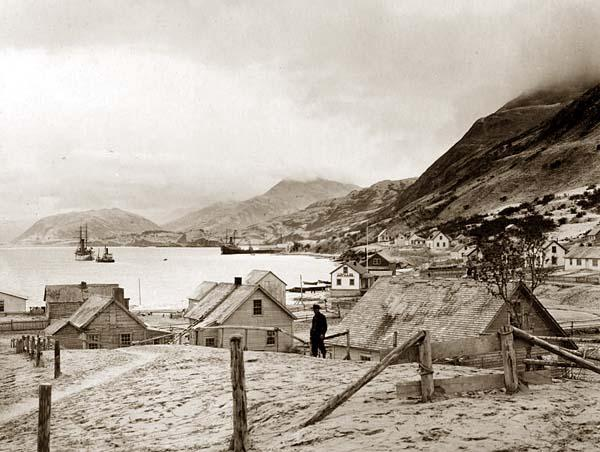
Kodiak, sometime shortly after 1900

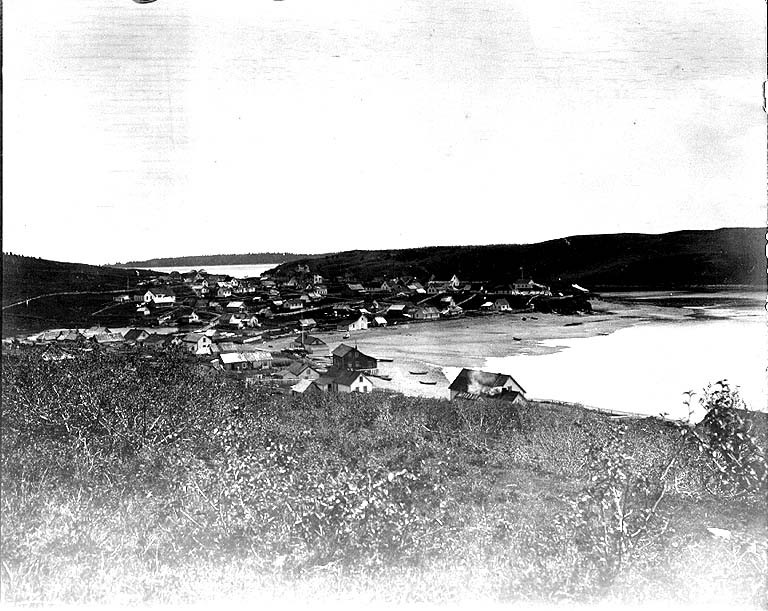
Panorama of Kodiak, 1908

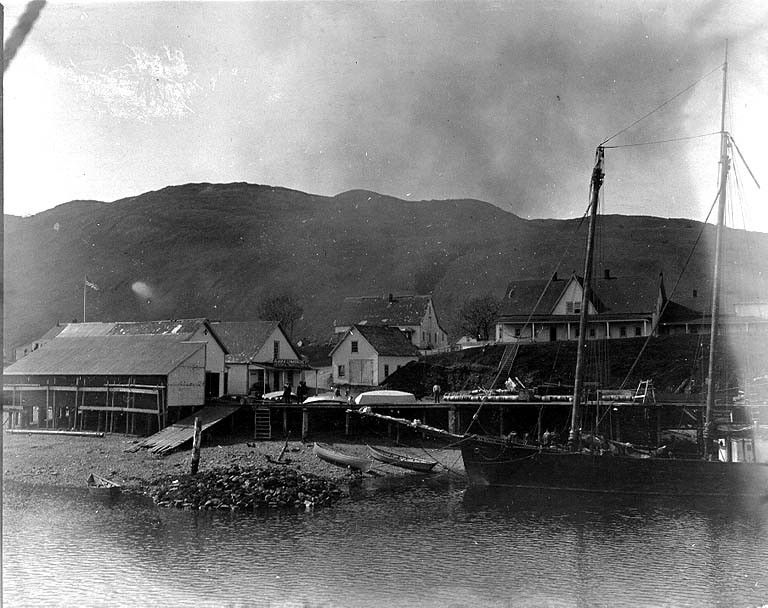
Alaska Commercial Company buildings in Kodiak, June 1908

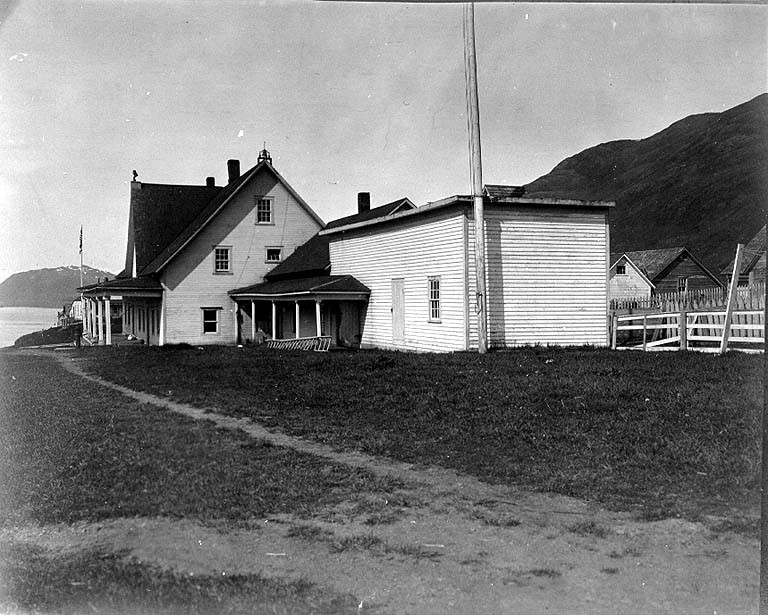
Alaska Commercial Company Superintendent's residence, 1908

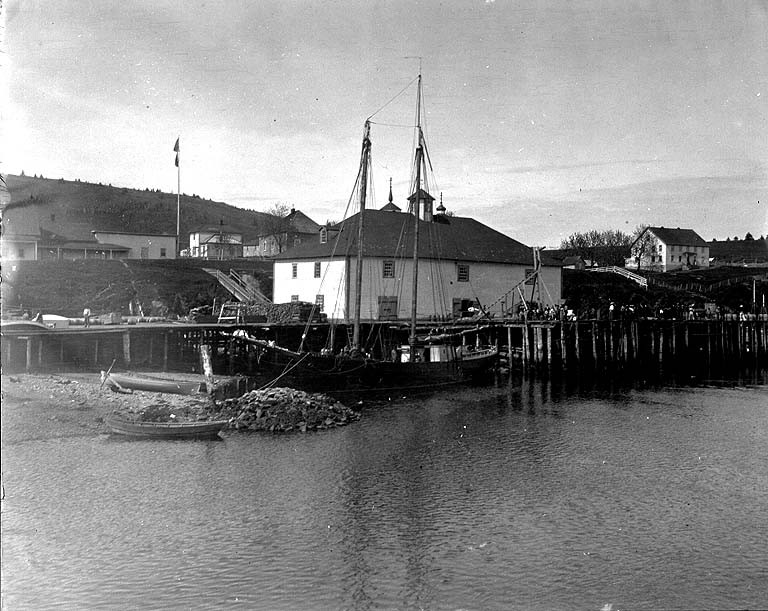
Warehouse and wharf in Kodiak, June 1908

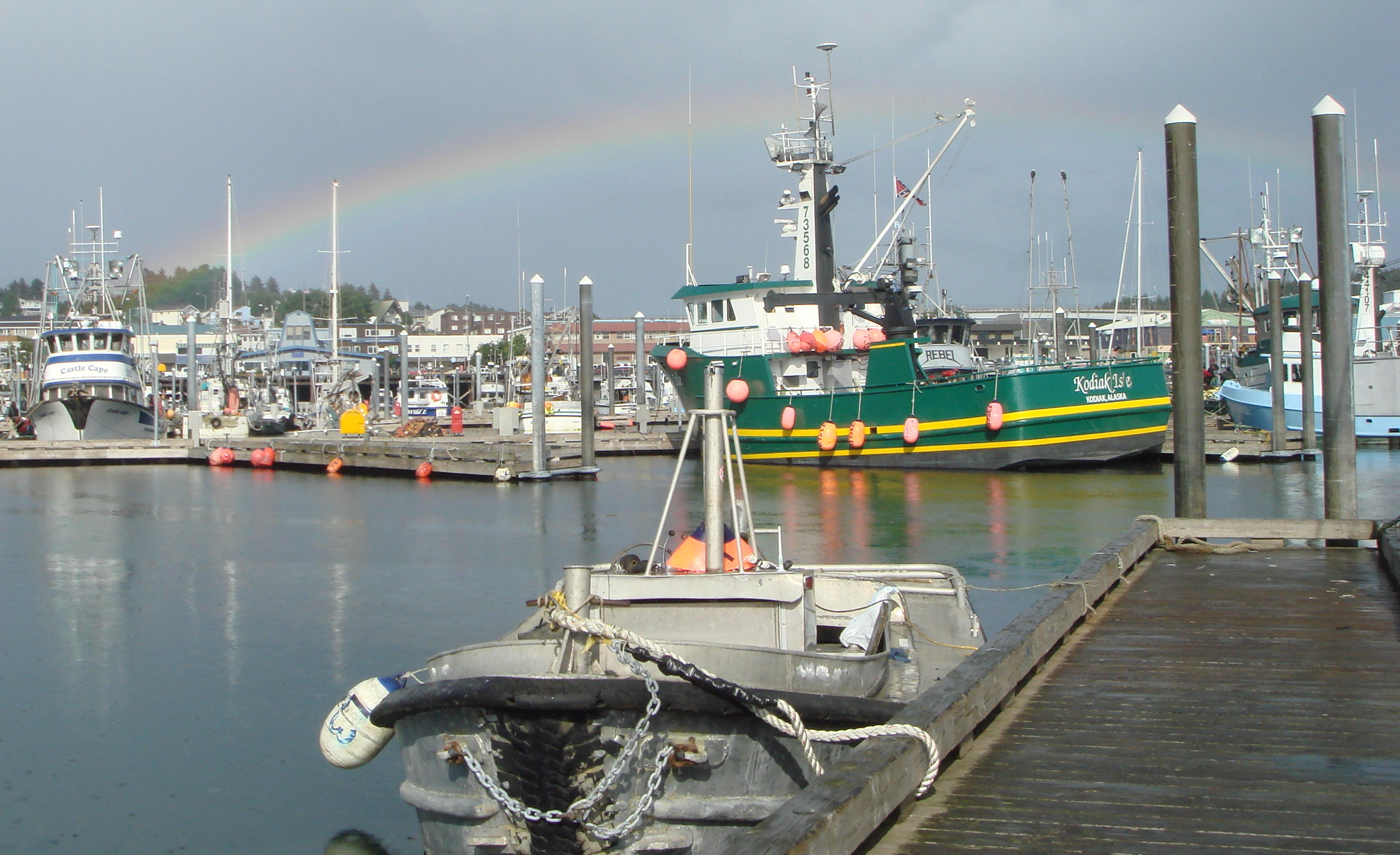
Kodiak Harbor, July 2009

== Geography ==
Kodiak is located on the eastern shore of Kodiak Island. According to the United States Census Bureau, the city has a total area of 4.9 square miles (12.6 km^{2}), divided into 3.5 sq mi (9.0 km^{2}) of land and 1.4 sq mi (3.6 km^{2}) (28.66%) of water.

=== Climate ===
Kodiak has a humid continental climate (Dfb) with cold winters and mild summers. Precipitation is heavy year-round, though markedly less in the summer months, when the Aleutian Low is at its weakest. There is a low degree of diurnal temperature variation throughout the year.

Climate data for Kodiak Airport, Alaska (1991–2020 normals, (Note: Mean monthly maxima and minima (i.e. the highest and lowest temperature readings during an entire month or year) calculated based on data at said location from 1991 to 2020.) extremes 1913–present (Note: Records for Kodiak have been kept at the Kodiak Airport since January 1931 and at an undisclosed location from September 1913 to December 1930. For more information, see ThreadEx))
Month	Jan	Feb	Mar	Apr	May	Jun	Jul	Aug	Sep	Oct	Nov	Dec	Year
Record high °F (°C)	54 (12)	60 (16)	57 (14)	70 (21)	80 (27)	86 (30)	83 (28)	86 (30)	80 (27)	74 (23)	60 (16)	65 (18)	86 (30)
Mean maximum °F (°C)	43.5 (6.4)	43.9 (6.6)	46.3 (7.9)	53.8 (12.1)	64.9 (18.3)	71.1 (21.7)	74.0 (23.3)	73.5 (23.1)	65.4 (18.6)	56.0 (13.3)	48.4 (9.1)	44.5 (6.9)	76.9 (24.9)
Mean daily maximum °F (°C)	36.1 (2.3)	37.5 (3.1)	38.8 (3.8)	44.7 (7.1)	51.7 (10.9)	57.0 (13.9)	61.8 (16.6)	62.8 (17.1)	57.1 (13.9)	48.3 (9.1)	41.2 (5.1)	37.3 (2.9)	47.9 (8.8)
Daily mean °F (°C)	31.2 (−0.4)	32.4 (0.2)	33.2 (0.7)	39.1 (3.9)	45.8 (7.7)	51.4 (10.8)	56.2 (13.4)	56.5 (13.6)	50.6 (10.3)	42.2 (5.7)	35.7 (2.1)	31.9 (−0.1)	42.2 (5.7)
Mean daily minimum °F (°C)	26.2 (−3.2)	27.2 (−2.7)	27.6 (−2.4)	33.6 (0.9)	39.9 (4.4)	45.7 (7.6)	50.5 (10.3)	50.3 (10.2)	44.2 (6.8)	36.0 (2.2)	30.2 (−1.0)	26.5 (−3.1)	36.5 (2.5)
Mean minimum °F (°C)	8.2 (−13.2)	10.4 (−12.0)	13.1 (−10.5)	22.3 (−5.4)	31.0 (−0.6)	37.1 (2.8)	43.1 (6.2)	41.1 (5.1)	32.1 (0.1)	23.9 (−4.5)	16.7 (−8.5)	9.1 (−12.7)	3.0 (−16.1)
Record low °F (°C)	−16 (−27)	−12 (−24)	−6 (−21)	7 (−14)	18 (−8)	30 (−1)	35 (2)	34 (1)	26 (−3)	7 (−14)	0 (−18)	−9 (−23)	−16 (−27)
Average precipitation inches (mm)	8.35 (212)	6.31 (160)	4.82 (122)	6.14 (156)	5.85 (149)	5.17 (131)	4.51 (115)	4.90 (124)	7.55 (192)	8.85 (225)	7.06 (179)	8.81 (224)	78.32 (1,989)
Average snowfall inches (cm)	14.5 (37)	14.4 (37)	12.3 (31)	6.2 (16)	0.5 (1.3)	0.0 (0.0)	0.0 (0.0)	0.0 (0.0)	0.0 (0.0)	0.7 (1.8)	6.1 (15)	15.6 (40)	70.3 (179)
Average extreme snow depth inches (cm)	6.3 (16)	7.0 (18)	4.9 (12)	1.9 (4.8)	0.0 (0.0)	0.0 (0.0)	0.0 (0.0)	0.0 (0.0)	0.0 (0.0)	0.3 (0.76)	2.1 (5.3)	5.4 (14)	11.7 (30)
Average precipitation days (≥ 0.01 in)	18.8	17.3	15.9	18.0	16.5	16.1	14.6	14.8	17.0	18.4	17.0	19.7	204.1
Average snowy days (≥ 0.1 in)	8.9	7.6	9.2	4.0	0.5	0.0	0.0	0.0	0.0	1.1	5.1	9.1	45.5
Average relative humidity (%)	78.0	76.6	73.4	72.4	76.2	80.4	82.4	81.7	80.6	74.9	75.0	75.7	77.1
Average dew point °F (°C)	24.6 (−4.1)	23.7 (−4.6)	24.8 (−4.0)	28.2 (−2.1)	35.8 (2.1)	43.2 (6.2)	48.4 (9.1)	48.6 (9.2)	43.7 (6.5)	32.4 (0.2)	27.0 (−2.8)	24.3 (−4.3)	33.7 (0.9)
Source: NOAA (relative humidity and dew point 1961–1990)

See or edit raw graph data.

== Demographics ==
Historical population
Census	Pop.	Note	%±
1880	288		—
1890	495		71.9%
1900	341		−31.1%
1910	438		28.4%
1920	374		−14.6%
1930	442		18.2%
1940	864		95.5%
1950	1,710		97.9%
1960	2,628		53.7%
1970	3,798		44.5%
1980	4,756		25.2%
1990	6,365		33.8%
2000	6,334		−0.5%
2010	6,130		−3.2%
2020	5,581		−9.0%

Kodiak first appeared on the 1880 U.S. Census as the village of Saint Paul (not to be confused with the city of St. Paul located in the Pribilof Islands). It reported a population of 288, of which 253 were Alaskan Creoles (a mixture of Russian and Native Alaskans), 20 Whites and 15 Aleuts. In 1890, it would report as "Kadiak" (the then-spelling). In 1900, it returned as "Kadiak Settlement." From 1910 onwards, it reported as Kodiak, and would formally incorporate in 1940.

=== 2020 census ===
As of the 2020 census, Kodiak had a population of 5,581. The median age was 38.8 years. 21.7% of residents were under the age of 18 and 14.1% of residents were 65 years of age or older. For every 100 females there were 108.9 males, and for every 100 females age 18 and over there were 106.6 males age 18 and over.

95.2% of residents lived in urban areas, while 4.8% lived in rural areas.

There were 1,951 households in Kodiak, of which 34.4% had children under the age of 18 living in them. Of all households, 39.9% were married-couple households, 24.2% were households with a male householder and no spouse or partner present, and 28.0% were households with a female householder and no spouse or partner present. About 27.3% of all households were made up of individuals and 8.7% had someone living alone who was 65 years of age or older.

There were 2,272 housing units, of which 14.1% were vacant. The homeowner vacancy rate was 0.7% and the rental vacancy rate was 14.3%.

Racial composition as of the 2020 census
Race	Number	Percent
White	1,875	33.6%
Black or African American	33	0.6%
American Indian and Alaska Native	608	10.9%
Asian	2,302	41.2%
Native Hawaiian and Other Pacific Islander	62	1.1%
Some other race	195	3.5%
Two or more races	506	9.1%
Hispanic or Latino (of any race)	491	8.8%

=== 2000 census ===
As of the census of 2000, there were 6,334 people, 1,996 households, and 1,361 families residing in the city. The population density was 706.8 people/km^{2} (1,831 people/mi^{2}). There were 2,255 housing units at an average density of 251.6 persons per square kilometre (652 persons/mi^{2}). The racial makeup of the city was 46.4% White, 0.7% African American, 10.5% Native American, 31.7% Asian, 0.9% Pacific Islander, 4.4% from other races, and 5.4% from two or more races. 8.5% of the population were Hispanic or Latino of any race.

There were 1,996 households, out of which 40.2% had children under the age of 18 living with them, 52.1% were married couples living together, 10.3% had a woman whose husband does not live with her, and 31.8% were non-families. 24.2% of all households were made up of individuals, and 5.4% had someone living alone who was 65 years of age or older. The average household size was 3.10 and the average family size was 3.64.

In the city, the population was spread out, with 29.1% under the age of 18, 8.7% from 18 to 24, 32.2% from 25 to 44, 23.1% from 45 to 64, and 6.8% who were 65 years of age or older. The median age was 34 years. For every 100 females, there were 114.3 males. For every 100 females age 18 and over, there were 120.6 males.

The median income for a household in the city was $55,142, and the median income for a family was $60,484. Males had a median income of $37,074 versus $30,049 for females. The per capita income for the city was $21,522. 7.4% of the population and 3.7% of families were below the poverty line. Out of the total people living in poverty, 8.4% were under the age of 18 and 0.0% were 65 or older.

Kodiak is also home for a sizable community of Russian Orthodox Old Believers.

== Government ==
Kodiak is the headquarters of four federally recognized Alaska Native tribes: the Native Village of Afognak, Native Village of Akhiok, Sun'aq Tribe of Kodiak, and the Tangirnaq Native Village.

== Economy ==
Among the companies based in Kodiak is Koniag, Incorporated.

=== Alaska Department of Fish and Game ===
Kodiak is an important environmental asset, which affects the fishing industry, particularly salmon fishing. Its wild game is coveted by hunters worldwide for the Kodiak bear and other game animals; there are strict laws governing fishing and hunting activities as well as hiking near spawning streams. Both the department and the city maintain websites and publish brochures in order to help communicate these strictly enforced laws. All of the city's hotels and businesses have these materials in prominent areas for guests, and licenses can be purchased in the city's main sporting goods store and online.

=== Military installations ===
The United States Navy operates a small training base near the city called Naval Special Warfare Cold Weather Detachment Kodiak which trains United States Navy SEALs in cold weather survival and advanced tactics.

The United States Coast Guard has a major presence in Kodiak, Alaska.

- USCG SUPRTCN Kodiak - U.S. Coast Guard Support Center Kodiak
- USCG Air Station Kodiak
- USCGC Alex Haley
- USCGC Cypress
- USCGC Earl Cunningham
- USCGC Spar (Formerly)
- USCGC Douglas Munro (Formerly)
- Aids to Navigation Team Kodiak
- Communication Detachment Kodiak
- North Pacific Regional Fisheries Training Center (NPRFTC)
- Marine Safety Detachment Kodiak
- Naval Engineering Support Unit (NESU) Detachment Kodiak
- Electronic Systems Support Detachment Kodiak (ESD)

== Community events ==
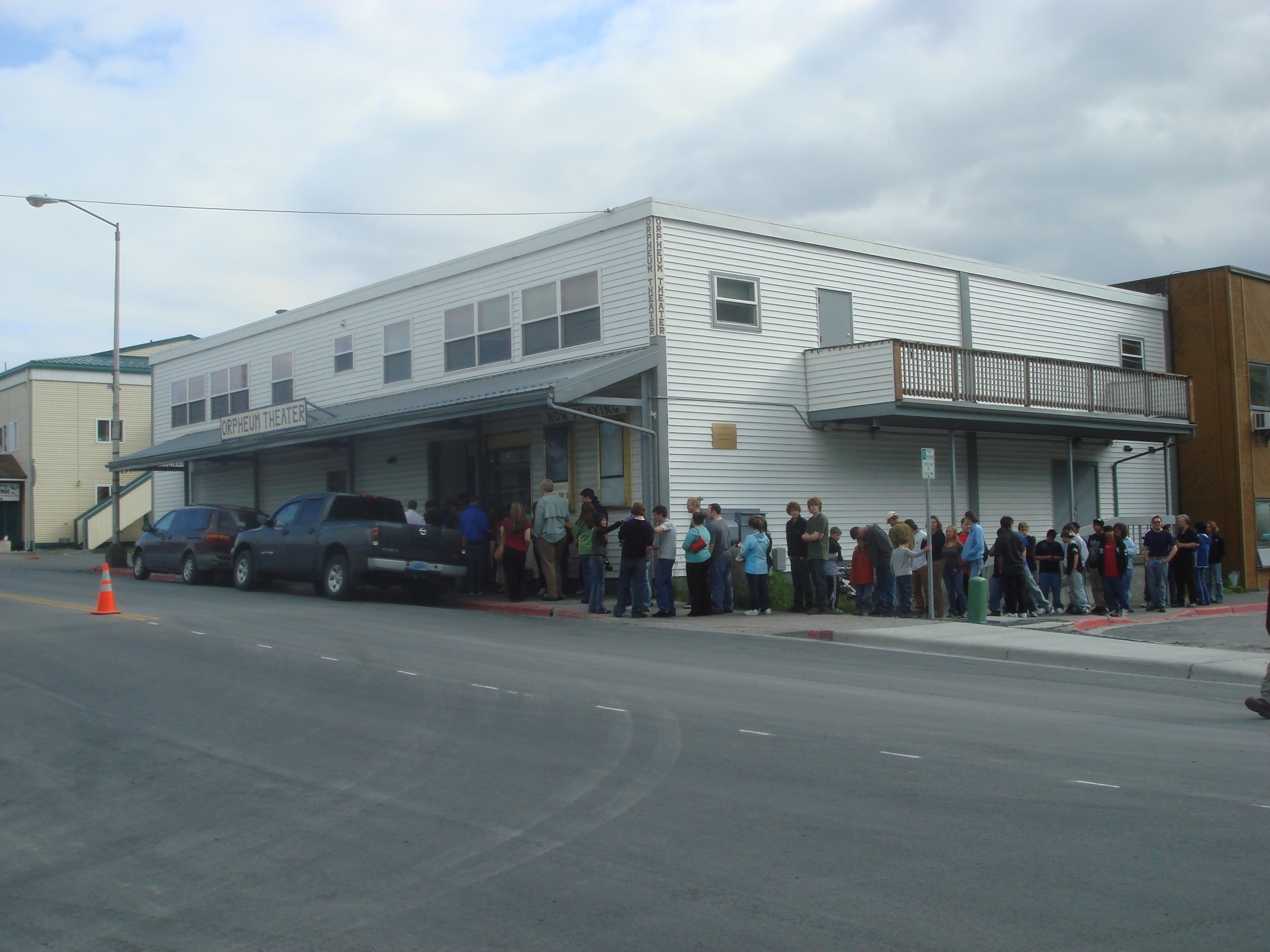
Customers line up in front of the Orpheum Theater

The city of Kodiak is home to a number of annual events that draw locals and people from off-island. The most well-known of these is Kodiak Crab Festival. Organized by the Kodiak Chamber of Commerce, the event takes place over Memorial Day weekend. It includes a county fair-style main event, with carnival rides, food and game booths, and group activities. In addition, a number of events are organized over the three-day weekend that include a kayak race, a marathon, an ultra-marathon, a 9.2-mile (14.8 km) mountain run called the Pillar Mountain Run and others.

The official Pardoning of the Crab was added to The Kodiak Crab Fest in 2019. A crab is given a crab themed name, and then saved from the crab pot by a special guest, and then goes to live at the Kodiak Fisheries Research Center Aquarium.

2019: Sheldon, pardoned by US Senator Dan Sullivan (R-AK). 2020: Unknown. 2021: Lenny Crabitz, pardoned by Kodiak City Manager Mike Tvenge.

== Education ==
The Kodiak Island Borough School District operates three elementary schools, one middle school and one high school (Kodiak High School) serving the town of Kodiak and the immediate area surrounding the city of Kodiak. A further 6 schools serve rural sites in the district and are operated as k-12 schools.

The city is home to Kodiak College, a satellite campus of the University of Alaska Anchorage. Within the public school district, there are eight rural schools.

Kodiak is also home to Saint Herman's Orthodox Theological Seminary, a theological school founded in 1972 under the auspices of the Orthodox Church in America. Students from villages all over southern and southwestern Alaska study at St. Herman's in order to become readers or clergy in the Orthodox Church.

== Media ==
- KMXT (100.1 FM) the community public radio station
- KODK (90.7 FM) public radio station
- KVOK-FM (101.1 FM) commercial radio station
- KVOK (560 AM and 98.7 FM) country radio station and home of Kodiak Bears athletics
- Kodiak Daily Mirror (Monday through Friday newspaper)

== Transportation ==
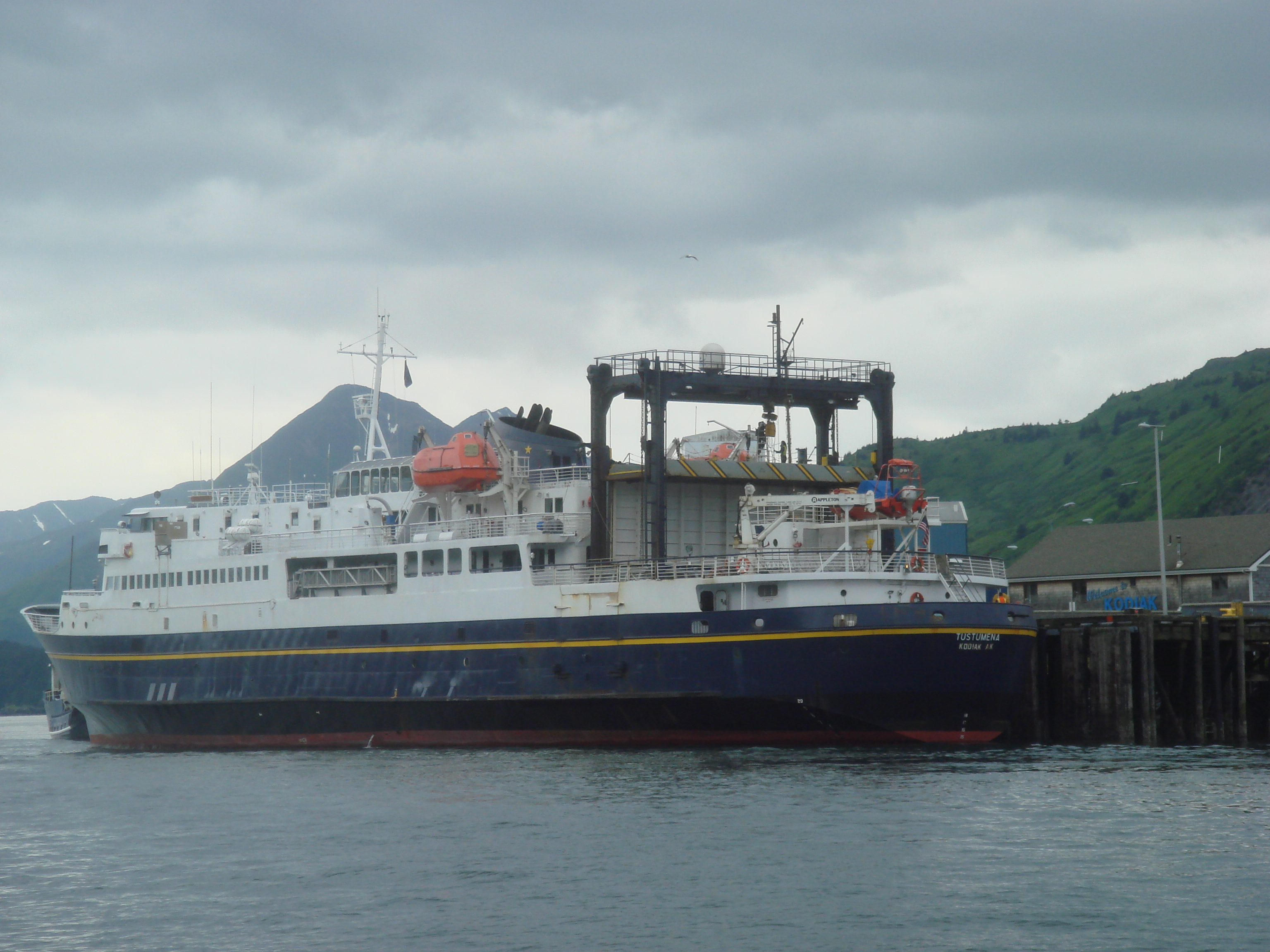
The ferryboat MV Tustumena is part of the Alaska Marine Highway. She can carry 210 passengers and serves Kodiak, Homer, Whittier, and the Aleutian Islands as far west as Dutch Harbor.

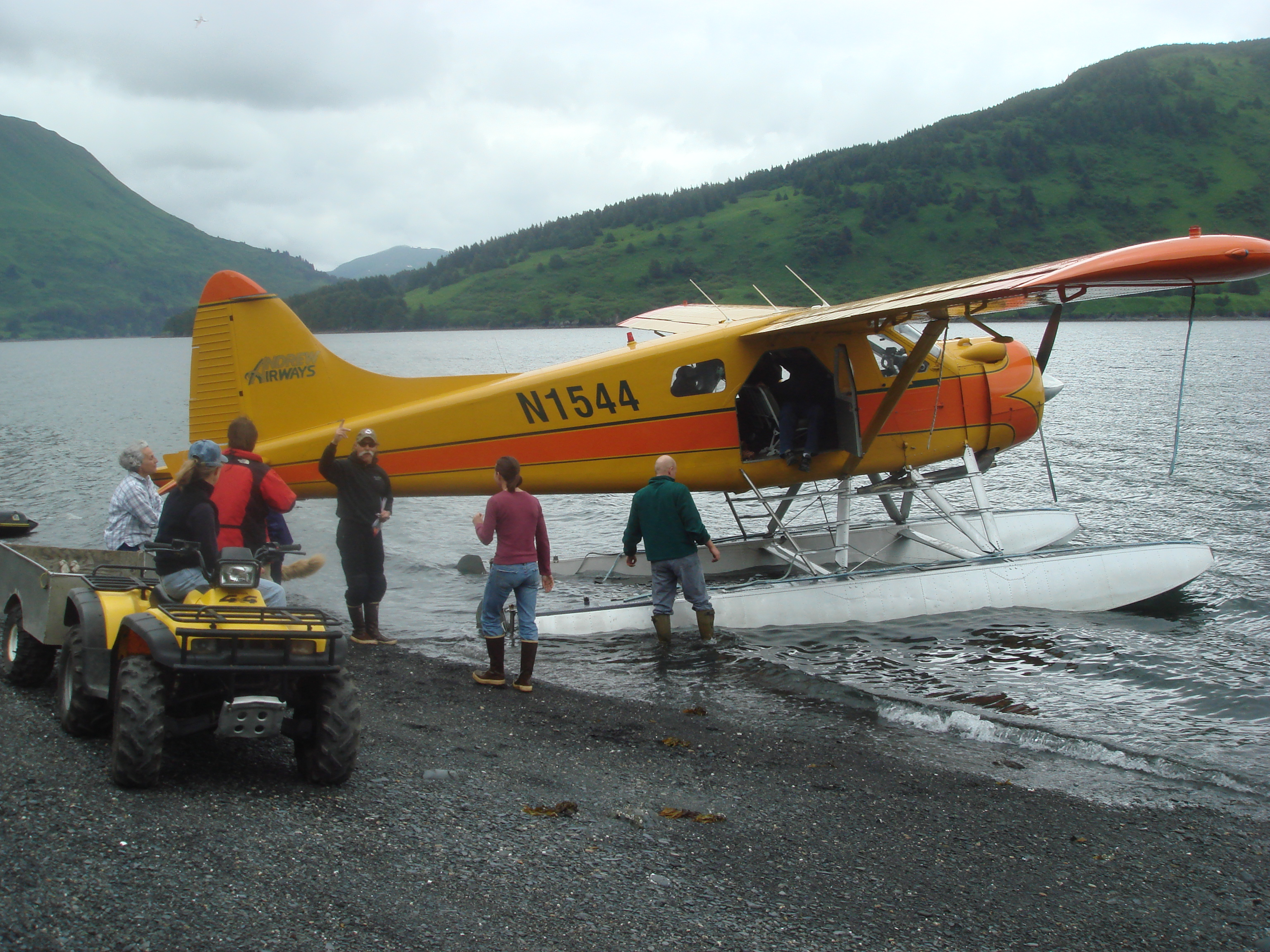
A floatplane dropping off guests at a remote wilderness lodge on Raspberry Island, part of the Kodiak Archipelago. All guests at these lodges begin their journey in the city of Kodiak.

Kodiak Airport attracts both local and regional airlines, air taxis, and charter floatplanes and helicopters which provide transportation to residents and tourists traveling on and off the island. The Alaska Marine Highway provides further transportation via two ferries, MV Tustumena and MV Kennicott. These ships can carry 211 and 748 passengers, respectively, and serve routes between Kodiak, Homer, and Whittier, although the ferry system no longer takes passengers to Seward. Floatplane and bush plane companies regularly take tourists to remote areas and wilderness lodges both on the various islands of the Kodiak Archipelago and the Katmai coast for bear viewing, hunting, and hikes. The city business community also has a fleet of privately owned taxis as well as kayaks, mountain bikes, and all-terrain vehicles (ATVs) for rent.

== Health care ==
Kodiak has robust primary care, led by Kodiak Area Native Association, a Tribal Health Organization with HRSA support that sees Native and Non-Native persons around the island, and Kodiak Community Health Center with smaller primary care practices in Kodiak. Specialty medical services are intermittently available at Kodiak Area Native Association and at Providence Kodiak Island Medical Center. Hospital and emergency care are provided at Providence Kodiak Island Medical Center, the only hospital on Kodiak Island. Individuals located in the smaller surrounding communities are cared for in small village clinics and, when critically ill, may be airlifted into Kodiak via helicopter or air ambulance due to remoteness and lack of roads.

== Energy ==
Because the City of Kodiak is situated on an island 90 miles southwest of the Kenai Peninsula, the community is unable to access Alaska's main "railbelt" electric grid. Instead, the city uses a utility distribution microgrid to supply power to residents and businesses on the island. The Kodiak Electrical Association (KEA) uses nearly 100% renewable energy, mostly from a combination of hydroelectric and wind generation. In the winter months if hydroelectric generation becomes difficult, Kodiak may use diesel generators to supplement energy needs.

Hydroelectric

80-85% of energy the Kodiak Electrical Association generates comes from the Terror Lake Dam. The project area of the Terror Lake Dam was evaluated for use as early as the 1930s, with more substantial proposals occurring in the 1950s and 60s. In 1973, the rise of diesel costs motivated the KEA to explore renewable energy sources, and in 1974, the KEA applied for a preliminary permit to build a dam at the outlet of Terror Lake. Because the project area sat on a National Wildlife Refuge, KEA worked closely with Fish and Wildlife Services, as well as the Federal Energy Regulatory Commission to survey the land extensively for environmental impact before finally being licensed to operate the project in 1982. Today, the Terror Lake Dam stands at 193 feet high and 2,100 feet long which has created a 1020-acre reservoir that generates 135 GWH annually.

Wind

Kodiak began considering renewable energy sources in addition to the Terror Lake Dam in the year 2000, soon after a new diesel-powered combined cycle plant was installed. In 2000, the Terror Lake dam only covered 41% of Kodiak's electricity needs. Diesel's fluctuating markets costs and the expensive price tag of shipping diesel to the island meant that Kodiak experienced major price volatility in regards to energy costs. Additionally, the island's wildlife refuge status made expanding hydroelectric generation very difficult. In 2009, Kodiak took its first big step towards ending reliance on diesel by installing three 1.5 MW turbines at Pillar Mountain. In 2012, Kodiak installed three additional 1.5 MW turbines for a total of nine MW between all six turbines. The General Electric wind turbines used for the Pillar Mountain project utilize variable wind power which means energy generation varies with weather patterns. Due to the varying energy production, efficient energy storage is necessary to avoid volatility in energy availability.

Diesel

Due to the installation of wind turbines in 2009 and 2012, Kodiak now rarely relies on diesel for energy; however, the city may sometimes use diesel in the cold months when water at the dam freezes over. This strategy is an example of a mobile microgrid where diesel is trucked to housing units and consumer energy costs are adjusted based on current diesel prices. Kodiak also uses diesel generators when maintenance is being run on the renewable sources. Maintenance requirements require the generators be turned on and inspected quarterly.

== In popular culture ==
In 2012, rapper Pitbull was involved in an advertising campaign with Walmart, in which the Walmart store that received the most "likes" on Facebook from June 18 to July 15, 2012, would have Pitbull visit and put on a show there. An orchestrated internet campaign urged people to vote for Kodiak, both as a reference to the Kodak company referenced in the intro to the 2011 Pitbull song "Give Me Everything" and the humor value in performing a concert at such a small venue in a remote secluded area resulting in a sizable lead for that store. Walmart eventually confirmed that Kodiak had won. Pitbull visited on July 30, where he received a Key to the City from mayor Branson and then made an appearance before a crowd of hundreds at the Coast Guard base.

The Weather Channel docu-series Coast Guard Alaska follows the lives of Coast Guard members stationed in Kodiak.

Czech carmaker Škoda Auto named their mid-size SUV the Škoda Kodiaq, after the Alaskan brown bear, and in tribute Kodiak was renamed Kodiaq for one day (May 6, 2016). In a spelling change also intended to honor the indigenous Alutiiq, the city was renamed with a number of signs changed across town, including the port facilities and city limits. The letter Q is a common ending for nouns in the Alutiiq language.

The film The Guardian (2006) is partially set in Kodiak, but was not filmed there.
