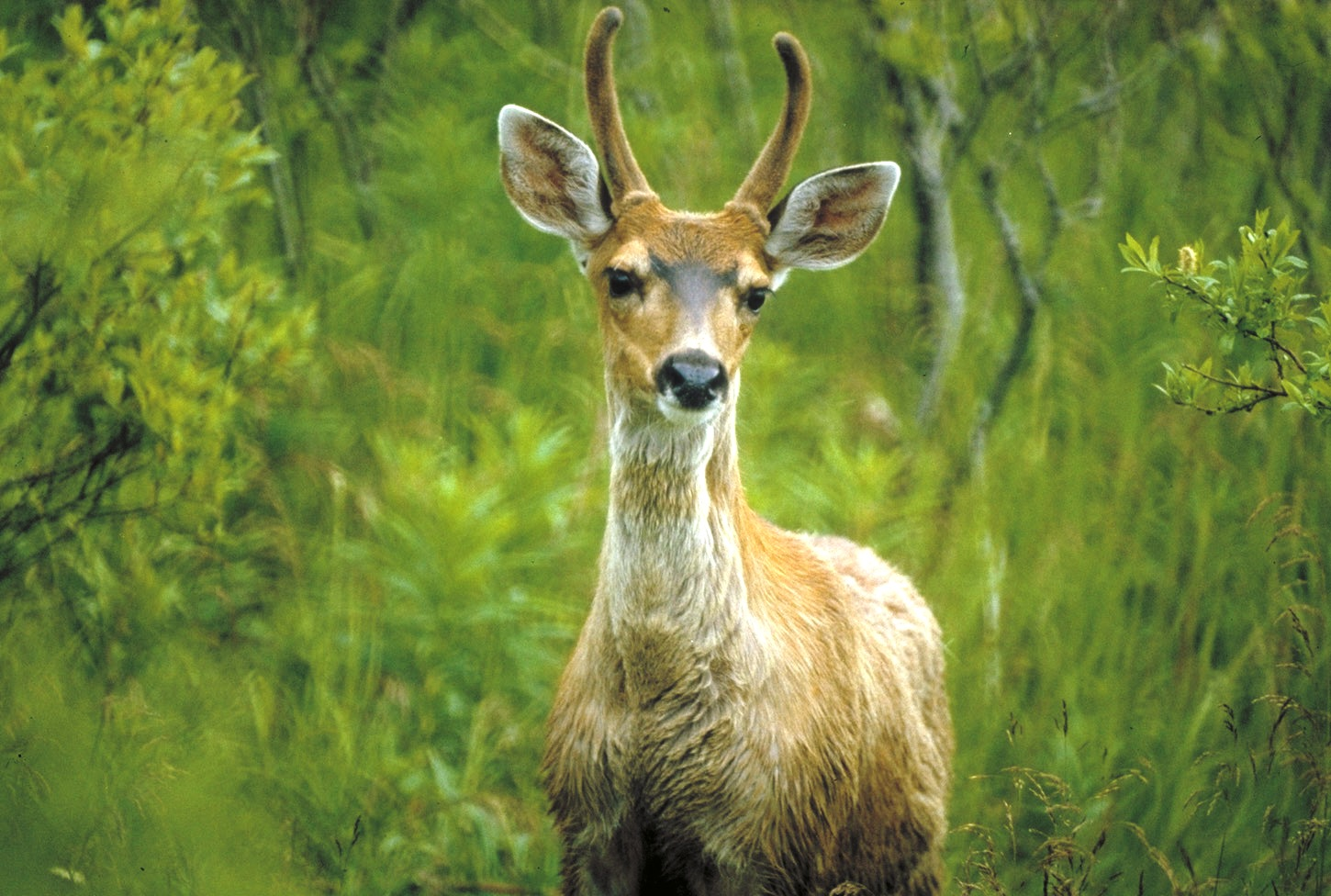

Scientific classification
- Kingdom: Animalia
- Phylum: Chordata
- Class: Mammalia
- Order: Artiodactyla
- Family: Cervidae
- Subfamily: Capreolinae
- Genus: Odocoileus
- Species: O. hemionus
- Subspecies: O. h. sitkensis

Trinomial name
- Odocoileus hemionus sitkensis Merriam, 1898

= Sitka deer =

Subspecies of deer

The Sitka deer or Sitka black-tailed deer (Odocoileus hemionus sitkensis) is a subspecies of the mule deer (Odocoileus hemionus), similar to the Columbian black-tailed subspecies (O. h. colombianus). Their name originates from Sitka, Alaska, and it is not to be confused with the similarly named sika deer. Weighing on average between 48 and 90 kg (106 and 198 lb), Sitka deer are characteristically smaller than other subspecies of mule deer. Reddish-brown in the summer, their coats darken to a gray-brown in mid- to late August. They are also good swimmers, and can occasionally be seen crossing deep channels between islands. Their average lifespan is about 10 years, but a few are known to have attained an age of 15.

== Habitat and life patterns ==
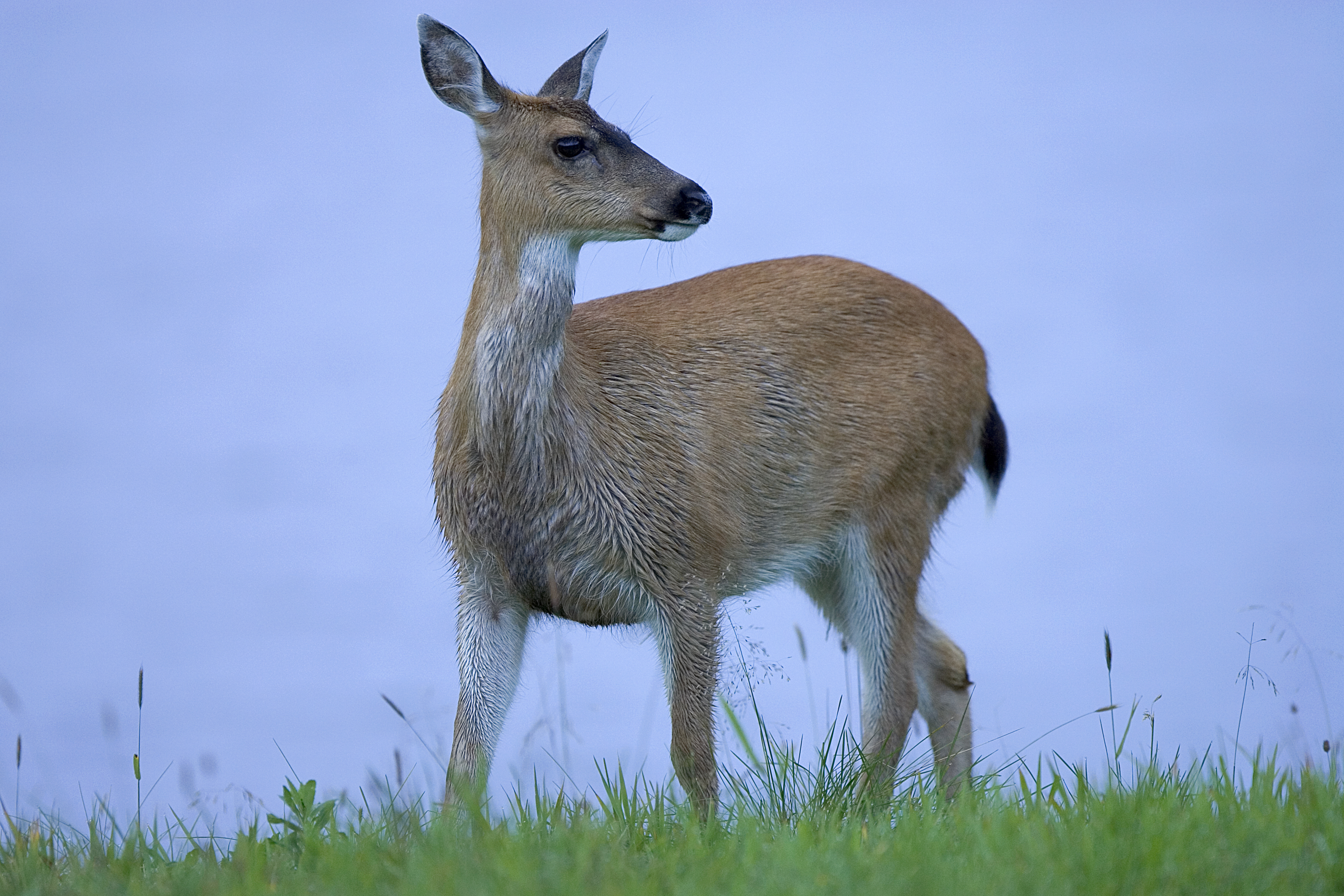
Sitka deer at the Kodiak National Wildlife Refuge

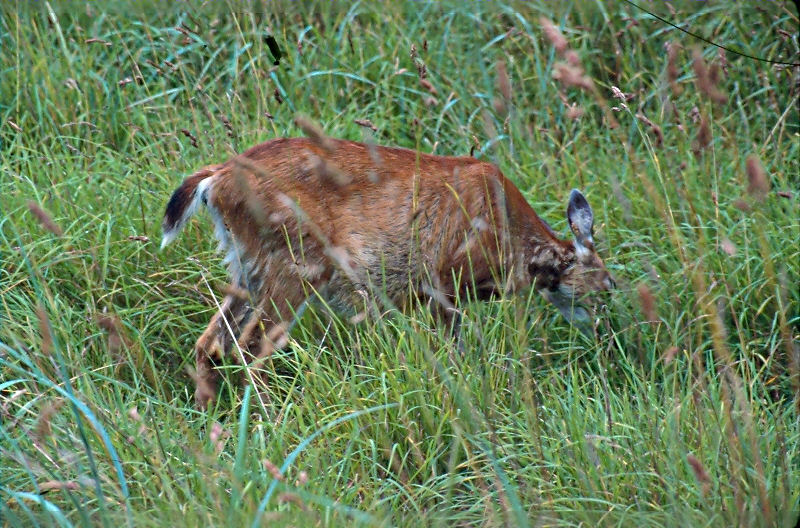
Doe feeding at Gwaii Haanas National Park

Sitka deer inhabit the coastal rainforests of northern British Columbia and southeastern Alaska. Their natural distribution included the Alexander Archipelago in Alaska and the adjacent mainland coast north to Yakutat. They were also introduced to Haida Gwaii (Queen Charlotte Islands) in the 1890s, Prince William Sound during 1917–1923, the Kodiak Island Archipelago in 1924 and 1930, Yakutat in 1924, and the Skagway and Haines area during the 1950s.

Sitka deer can be both migratory and residential depending on their habitat; but during winter, they primarily reside in old or mixed-age forest growth below 1,500 feet (460 m), except on the southern two-thirds of Kodiak Island, where forest cover is absent. The rut peaks in mid-November and fawns are born in early June; they weigh 6–8 lb (2.7–3.6 kg). Bucks can weigh up to 120–200 lb (54–91 kg) and does can weigh 80–100 lb (36–45 kg).

== Diet ==
Sitka deer primarily eat green vegetation. However, during the intense Alaskan winters, they also feed on woody vegetation and lichens. Sitka deer have no upper incisors, and digest vegetation through grinding plant material between their upper and lower molars. All Odocoileus species are ruminants, in that they have four-chambered stomachs which allow them to "ruminate" (rechew) their food, and contains bacteria specialized in breaking down cellulose. Since these bacteria are so specialized, they have tremendous difficulty digesting strange material and can die of starvation with their bellies full of food. Sitka deer feed on several plants and algae natural to their environment, including "Red Alder" Alnus rubra, "fireweed" Chamaenerion angustifolium, "dandelion" Taraxacum officinale, "skunk cabbage" Lysichiton americanus, "deer heart" Maianthemum dilatatum, "Salmonberry" Rubus spectabilis and "bull kelp" Nereocystis luetkeana. Sitka deer will also opportunistically feed on domestic plants and trees including, apple trees, cherry trees, plum trees, strawberry plants, raspberry plants and black berry plants.

== Population and hunting ==
Sitka deer population fluctuate considerably due to the harsh Alaskan winters and are typically estimated using pellet surveys, DNA, photo traps and other methods. However, they are an abundant species that rapidly recovers from low populations, especially on Admiralty, Baranof, Chichagof, Kodiak, and other islands where wolves are naturally absent. They are not designated at risk. Introduced in the 19th century, Sitka deer have become abundant on the islands of Haida Gwaii, overgrazing local flora, so the Haida Nation forest guardian program encourages meat hunting to reduce total numbers.

Natural predators include wolves, mountain lions, grizzly bears, and American black bears; credible reports have reported killer whales taking them while swimming in deeper water. Human predation seems to have little to no effect on Sitka deer populations. However, habitat loss from clear-cutting old growth forests may contribute to population decline. Normal adult antlers are often small in size; very few deer score above a 110 on the Boone and Crockett system.

Logging practices can affect the populations of the Sitka black-tailed deer. While clearcutting is thought to provide more and better habitat for the Sitka deer clear-cutting can also have a diverse effect on the deer. Hunters have always focused on these clearcut areas and for good reason. However, when the winter has deep snow these clearcut areas are covered leaving less food when the Sitka needs it most. A secondary problem is the energy that is needed for the deer to travel through these areas when the snow is so deep.
