= KVOK-FM =

Radio station in Kodiak, Alaska

- Kodiak, Alaska; United States
- Broadcast area: Metro Kodiak
- Frequency: 101.1 MHz (HD Radio)
- Branding: Hot 101.1

Programming
- Format: Contemporary hit radio
- Subchannels: HD2: Country music

Ownership
- Owner: Kodiak Island Broadcasting Company, Inc.

History
- First air date: 1987
- Former call signs: KQTA (1984–1984); KJJZ (1984–1996); KRXX (1996–2020)
- Call sign meaning: Voice of Kodiak

Technical information
- Licensing authority: FCC
- Facility ID: 12186
- Class: A
- ERP: 3,100 watts
- HAAT: 7 meters (23 ft)
- Transmitter coordinates: 57°47′3.0″N 152°23′57.0″W
- Translator: HD2: 98.7 K254BA (Kodiak)

Links
- Public license information: Public file; LMS
- Webcast: Listen live; Listen live (HD2)
- Website: kvok.com

KVOK-FM is a contemporary hit radio formatted broadcast radio station licensed to Kodiak, Alaska, serving Metro Kodiak. KVOK-FM is owned and operated by Kodiak Island Broadcasting Company, Inc.

== HD radio ==
The station's HD2 subchannel carries a country music format known as 98.7 KVOK. This feeds a translator at 98.7 FM. The format was that previously heard on KVOK 560 AM until it went off the air in May 2019 after losing its transmitter site.
