= KVOK (AM) =

Radio station in Kodiak, Alaska, United States (1974–2019)

- Kodiak, Alaska; United States
- Broadcast area: Kodiak Island
- Frequency: 560 kHz

Ownership
- Owner: Kodiak Island Broadcasting Company, Inc.
- Sister stations: KRXX

History
- First air date: 1974
- Last air date: May 7, 2019
- Call sign meaning: "Voice of Kodiak"

Technical information
- Facility ID: 12185
- Class: B
- Power: 1,000 watts (unlimited)
- Transmitter coordinates: 57°46′33.0″N 152°32′7.0″W
- Translator: via KRXX-HD2: 98.7 K254BA (Kodiak)

KVOK was a full service and country formatted broadcast radio station licensed to Kodiak, Alaska, serving Kodiak Island. The station was last owned and operated by Kodiak Island Broadcasting Company, Inc.

KVOK was taken silent May 7, 2019, after losing its transmitter site which was leased from the United States Coast Guard. On May 7, 2020, the KVOK license was surrendered to the Federal Communications Commission. Since the FM translator was now being fed by an HD Radio subchannel of KRXX (which became KVOK-FM at the same time), the country format remained on 98.7 FM.
