= 3 Local Boyz =

Hawaiian disc jockey group

3 Local Boys is a group famous for their parody songs such as "I'm a Filipino" and their hit "I'm So Hungry", a parody of 2 Live Crew's "Me So Horny" that played over Hawaiian local airwaves. The group released their first album, "Radio Will Nevah Be Da Same", in 1989.

== History ==
The 3 Local Boyz was a short-lived local Hawaiian radio disc jockey group on the I-94 (KIKI-FM) radio station from the late 1980s to the 1990s, known by their nicknames "Jimmy Da Geek" (James Bender), Lanai Boyee (Grant Tabura), and Alan "da Cruzah" Oda, with Matt Young as record producer and recorder. Hawaiian Ryan (Ryan Matsumoto), featured on their album, attended Kaiser High School where he met both Lanai Boyee and Jimmy Da Geek. Oda then left the group and was replaced by Matsumoto. They have produced parody songs on their 1990 album Rasta Revolution that can be described as being FOBish.

The 3 Local Boyz then became the 2 Local Boyz with Lanai Boyee and Jimmy Da Geek releasing another album. Then Jimmy Da Geek left I-94 and was replaced by comedian Augie T. (or Augie Tulba). The new duo released a CD called Home in da Housing.

All individuals have moved on. Jimmy Da Geek has gone on to radio for KCCN-FM then KQMQ-FM and released his own solo album, titled So So Haolefied. He now resides in Mesa, Arizona. Alan "da Cruzah" Oda later became a radio executive, went to California and Arizona, then retired from radio and moved home to Hilo. Hawaiian Ryan too released his own album (Saving Ryan's Privates) and did Christian rock while pursuing comedy. His radio career landed him at stations like KQMQ and KPHW. He now works for WRDW-FM in Philadelphia. Lanai went on to radio for KDNN.

Augie T was elected to represent District 9 of the Honolulu City Council on November 3, 2020.

== Discography ==
=== Rasta Revolution ===
- Year: 1990
- Genre: Comedy, Rap, Hip-Hop
- Label: Hip Jam Records
- Producers: Jimmy the Geek, Lanai Boy, and featuring Hawaiian Ryan
- Recorded Media: Cassette tape

Track	Parody of
"Chinese"	Kapena's "Crazy"
"Rice Rice Baybee"	Vanilla Ice's "Ice Ice Baby"
"Tiny Boobies"	Don Ho's "Tiny Bubbles"
"Killa Wiffa (Somebody Farted)"	MC Hammer's Let's Get it Started
"Three Rasta Boyz"	Bob Marley's "Three Little Birds"
"Dig It"	Young MC's "Bust a Move"
"I'm a Filipino"	The O'Kaysions' "Girl Watcher"
"Jamaican Fairy"	Harry Bellafonte "Jamaican Farewell"

=== Home in da Housing ===
- Year: 1995
- Genre: Comedy
- Label: Tropical Records
- Recorded Media: CD, Cassette tape
- Note: 2 Local Boyz

Number	Track
1	"Local Game Shows"
2	"We Go Together"
3	"Nursery Rhymes"
4	"Love & Obesity"
5	"Was Up Kalone"
6	"At Home in the Housing"
7	"Soap Opera Pregnancy Test"
8	"Living in the Housing"
9	"Makiki Axe Murdered"
10	"Prison"
11	"Sole Flex"
12	"My Tita is Good"

=== Soul Braddah ===
- Year: 1995
- Recorded Media: CD, Cassette tape
- Note: 2 Local Boyz

=== Other releases ===
Track	Notes
"Me So Hungry"	Parody based on 2 Live Crew's "Me So Horny"
"Christmas Wrapping"	Single track; Producers: Augie Tulba, Lanai & Friends; Album: Hawaiian Style Christmas 2; Label: Neos Productions
"Wiping Out"	Single track; Producers: Alan "da Kruzah" Oda, Lanai & Augie T (Local Boyz); Album: Sessions: Summer/Winter Edition Vol. 1; Year: 1996; Label: Polystar
