= KPRP (AM) =

Radio station in Honolulu

- Honolulu, Hawaii; United States
- Broadcast area: Honolulu metropolitan area
- Frequency: 650 kHz
- Branding: The Vine Connection

Programming
- Format: Urban gospel

Ownership
- Owner: Raleigh-Wake Chapter of the National Alumni Association of Shaw University
- Sister stations: KKNE

History
- First air date: October 17, 1946
- Former call signs: KPOA (1946–1960); KKAA (1960); KORL (1960–1992); KHNR (1992–2005); KRTR (2005–2013)
- Former frequencies: 630 kHz (1946–1959)

Technical information
- Licensing authority: FCC
- Facility ID: 13880
- Class: B
- Power: 10,000 watts (unlimited)
- Transmitter coordinates: 21°26′43″N 158°03′49″W

Links
- Public license information: Public file; LMS

KPRP (650 kHz) is a non-commercial educational radio station licensed to Honolulu, Hawaii, United States, which serves the Honolulu metropolitan area. It is currently owned by Raleigh-Wake Chapter of the National Alumni Association of Shaw University.

What was KPRP started as KPOA on 630 kHz in 1946 as the fourth radio station in Honolulu, with programming including popular disc jockeys. The station was known as KORL from 1960 to 1988, airing various music and talk formats; this run ended with the station filing for bankruptcy and going off the air for several years. It returned to broadcasting in 1992 as KHNR, an all-news and later news/talk radio station. After then-owner Salem Communications traded two of its AM stations for an FM in Honolulu, the format was changed to easy listening music as KRTR. SummitMedia acquired the Honolulu cluster from Cox Radio in 2013; KRTR then was leased to Pinoy Power Media and operated as KPRP until 2021, programming primarily in the Filipino language.

Taken off the air for technical reasons, KPRP briefly broadcast again in 2022 before SummitMedia surrendered the broadcast license in December 2022, but was reinstated after a donation agreement was reached in March 2023; when that donation was rescinded by May, the license was surrendered again. KPRP was again reinstated by August 2023 after another donation was agreed to with the Raleigh-Wake Chapter of the National Alumni Association of Shaw University and resumed broadcasting by November.

== History ==
=== KPOA ===
On November 9, 1945, the Island Broadcasting Company, a partnership of three men—Henry C. Putnam, John D. Keating, and J. Elroy McCaw—applied to the Federal Communications Commission for permission to build a new radio station on 630 kHz in Honolulu. The commission approved the application on April 10, 1946, and Putnam—whose involvement in Honolulu radio dated to 1935—announced that the station would seek to assemble a staff of as many World War II veterans as possible, befitting the venture started by three Army veterans. The call sign, KPOA, commemorated those who had fought in the "Pacific Ocean areas" of the war. It was one of three new stations built in Honolulu during 1946. Studios were built at Date Street and Kapiolani Boulevard on land leased from the ʻIolani School.

KPOA began broadcasting on October 17, 1946. Putnam exited the station less than a year later to return to active duty in the Army; though he announced that he would be selling his ownership interest to Keating and McCaw, he did not do so until 1949. In July 1950, KPOA replaced Honolulu station KHON and three other outlets on other islands as Hawaii's Mutual Broadcasting System outlet when the stations opted to focus on local programming.

In the 1950s, Keating and McCaw expanded their broadcast holdings, including several purchases in partnership. In February 1950, the pair purchased KYA in San Francisco, On March 25, 1951, Island Broadcasting-owned KILA began operating from Hilo. Two years later, McCaw and Keating acquired KONA-TV, a struggling Honolulu television station, in a joint venture with the Honolulu Advertiser newspaper, and Island Broadcasting also acquired WINS in New York City.

In programming, KPOA was the home of two of the first popular disc jockeys in Hawaii, briefly at the same time: Hal Lewis, also known as J. Akuhead Pupule, and Robert Melvin "Lucky" Luck, who later competed against Lewis in the morning time slot.

A 1953 FCC order required McCaw to divest some broadcast holdings in order to come under newly redefined radio station ownership limits. McCaw decided to exit his Hawaii radio holdings. KILA in Hilo was sold to its general manager, while KPOA was acquired for $400,000 by Radio Hawaii, a subsidiary of the Tele-Trip Corporation of New York in early 1954. Tele-Trip, whose original line of business was aviation insurance, then purchased WTAC in Flint, Michigan, and KQV in Pittsburgh. In purchasing KPOA from McCaw and Keating, the partners in Radio Hawaii also acquired the option to purchase half of Denver television station KTVR, which they exercised.

Radio Hawaii applied to the FCC in 1956 to move KPOA from 630 to 650 kHz and increase its power from 5,000 to 10,000 watts, a request the commission granted after a hearing in March 1958. The change took effect on March 30, 1959.

=== KKAA and KORL ===
In 1960, station management opted to change the call sign because of confusion with the similarly named KPOI (1040 AM). After being unsuccessful in its attempt to buy the name KISS from a station in San Antonio, Texas, the station adopted the designation KKAA ("Double K, Double A") on July 1, 1960. The name was scrapped within four months as the station became KORL on October 26. Studios were relocated to the Waikiki Biltmore Hotel in 1962 and remained there until 1968.

KORL adopted a news/talk format in 1972. This lasted until 1975, when the station switched to an automated Top 40 format and shed 10 employees in the process. The switch threatened a series of radio courses offered by Hawaii Pacific College, with which KORL had partnered since 1973; after threats of legal action, KORL aired courses on Chinese history and marriage to their conclusion.

Radio Hawaii sold KORL to the O'Day Broadcasting Company, a joint venture headed by longtime Seattle broadcaster Pat O'Day, in 1976. O'Day Broadcasting filed for bankruptcy organization in 1983, and Pacific Broadcasting Corporation purchased it in 1984.

In January 1987, KORL switched to a Hawaiian music format, intending to bring a younger sound to the airwaves than format stalwart KCCN offered; however, despite ratings increasing, the station's holding company filed for bankruptcy that May after a local consortium failed to raise the necessary capital to purchase it from Pacific Broadcasting. An auction was then held, but technicalities meant that there were no qualified bidders at the auction; several parties contended that auctioneers failed to divulge the need for bidders to register or a cash deposit requirement. Though reports suggested that three prospective buyers emerged after the auction, the station went off the air a week later after a power surge affected its tower on Ala Wai Boulevard. KLHI, a jazz station on Maui, then leased KORL and began to broadcast its programming on the frequency. KORL was off the air again by July 1988, in part because the Ala Wai tower—shared by four AM stations—emitted excessive electromagnetic radiation that, per a study by the Environmental Protection Agency, posed an immediate risk to residents of nearby high-rise buildings.

=== KHNR ===
A local group including former Hawaii governor George Ariyoshi acquired the license from Pacific Broadcasting and the equipment from O'Day, to whom rights had reverted under the terms of a promissory note, effective December 30, 1991. Immediately, the group announced it planned to return KORL to the air with a news radio format utilizing the audio of CNN Headline News. Mainland broadcasting executive Anthony Cassara moved to Honolulu to set up the operation. To reflect the new format, the call letters were changed to KHNR (Headline News Radio) before returning to the air in late March. A partnership with KHON-TV saw KHON reporters file radio reports for KHNR and the station simulcast the television station's morning and 6 p.m. newscasts.

Thomas Gentry, a developer, became the majority owner of the station in 1994 amid a restructuring; studios were moved from downtown into a Gentry-owned building in Iwilei. He sold the station the next year to DCP Broadcasting, which in turn sold KHNR to Chagal Hawaii in 1997. The new owners also acquired KGU and converted that station to Hawaii's first all-sports format. By 1999, the station added local morning and afternoon drive programs to the Headline News audio, as well as a talk show with Honolulu mayor Jeremy Harris.

Salem Communications acquired KHNR and KGU, along with KAIM-AM-FM, in October 1999. Five years later, it purchased the former KPOI-FM 97.5 as part of divestitures required in another transaction and changed it to a simulcast of KHNR as KHNR-FM, by which time the station's format had shifted to conservative talk.

=== Cox, SummitMedia and two donation attempts ===
Shortly after launching KHNR-FM, Salem announced it would trade two AM stations, KHNR and KPHW (940 AM), to Cox Radio in exchange for KGMZ-FM 107.9. The swap took effect at the start of 2005, at which time the 650 frequency acquired the call sign KRTR and adopted an easy listening format.

Cox shed its Honolulu cluster and several others to SummitMedia in 2013. The station was then leased to Pinoy Power Radio under a new local marketing agreement that October 4. Pinoy Power operated KPRP with a mix of Filipino language and other multicultural programming from studios in downtown Honolulu's Fort Street Mall.

In early 2021, KPRP went dark; it returned to the air with 1,000 watts in February 2022, citing a faulty transmitter for the silence. The license was surrendered to the Federal Communications Commission on December 5, 2022, along with KKNE (the former KPHW). Both licenses were reinstated by March 2023 when Saul Levine's Advanced Public Radio agreed to accept them via a donation; after the donation agreement fell apart two months later, the licenses were deleted again. SummitMedia ultimately reinstated and donated the licenses for KPRP and KKNE to the Raleigh-Wake Chapter of the National Alumni Association of Shaw University in August 2023, which stipulated that KPRP and KKNE be run as non-commercial educational stations. KPRP resumed broadcasting on November 22, 2023, with the donation pending.
