= KLEO =

- Kahaluu, Hawaii; United States
- Broadcast area: Kailua-Kona, Hawaii
- Frequency: 106.1 MHz
- Branding: KBIG 97.9 & 106.1

Programming
- Format: Hot adult contemporary (KKBG simulcast)

Ownership
- Owner: Pacific Radio Group, Inc.
- Sister stations: KLUA, KKBG, KPVS, KHLO, KKON

History
- First air date: 1969

Technical information
- Licensing authority: FCC
- Facility ID: 52443
- Class: C
- ERP: 7,300 watts
- HAAT: 913 meters (2,995 ft)
- Transmitter coordinates: 19°43′16″N 155°55′15″W

Links
- Public license information: Public file; LMS
- Webcast: Listen Live
- Website: kbigfm.com

KLEO (106.1 FM) is a radio station broadcasting a hot adult contemporary format simulcasting co-owned KKBG from Hilo. Licensed to Kahaluu, Hawaii, United States. The station is currently owned by Pacific Radio Group, Inc.

The call letters were previously used (1958–1980) by an AM radio station (1480) in Wichita, Kansas.
