= Mele Apana =

Hawaiian veteran and entertainer (born 1974)

Christine "Mele" Apana
- Born: 20 May 1974 (age 52); Kapaʻa, Hawaii
- Education: Kamehameha Schools
- Parent: Charlotte Apana
- Awards: Louise Aʻoe McGregor Award
- Presenting career
- Show: Morning Jam, Nāʻau Therapy
- Stations: KCCN-FM, KINE-FM
- Network: SummitMedia
- Show: Hawaii News Now
- Stations: KITV, KHNL
- Country: United States

Christine "Mele" Apana is a radio broadcaster, television entertainment reporter and personality, entertainer, emcee, and actress in Honolulu, Hawaii. She has presented numerous events in Hawaii entertainment including the Nā Hōkū Hanohano Awards alongside Billy V.

== Early life ==
Mele Apana was born and grew up in Kapaʻa, Hawaii and pursued her education at Kamehameha Schools where she graduated in 1992.

As a toddler, Apana was heavily influenced by her aunt, Kauaʻi entertainer and kumu hula, Lovely Apana. She grew up singing and dancing hula at lūʻau shows produced by her aunt and family. As she grew older, Apana would join her aunt to promote the family's music and hula events. It was during this time that she met Uncle Moe Keale and began mimicking what the entertainers would do.

During her time at Kamehameha Schools, Apana lead her class for four straight years at the renowned Kamehameha Schools Song Contest held at the Neal S. Blaisdell Center in Honolulu, Hawaii. In her senior year, she was awarded the Louise Aʻoe McGregor Award for outstanding student directorship.

== Career ==
Apana began her radio career in 1998 when she was approached by the program director of KCCN-FM station of Honolulu to be a part of the on-air personality team. This began a more than 30 year radio career with short stints on radio stations like KPHW and KDNN.

By the early 2000s, Apana had quickly garnered popularity and was asked to co-host the morning radio segment on KINE-FM with Shannon Scott. Together, they became known as "Da Kolohe Krew."

On January 6, 2022, Summit Media Hawaii, the owners of KCCN-FM and KINE-FM, conducted mass layoffs which included Apana, and other on-air personalities including Billy V, Shannon Scott, and longtime traffic news reporter Danielle Tucker.

As of 2025, Apana co-hosts a daytime television special, Island Life Live, on KITV with Davey D and Lina Girl.

== Credits ==
=== Radio ===
Year	Show	Role
1998	KCCN-FM	On-Air Personality
N/A	KPHW	On-Air Personality
N/A	KDNN	On-Air Personality
2011	KINE-FM	On-Air Personality

=== Television ===
Year	Title	Role
2021	Doogie Kameāloha, M.D.	Aunti #1
2023	Merrie Monarch Festival	Co-Emcee
2024	Island Life Live	Co-Host
2024	Tokyo Vice (TV series)	Performer
