= KGU =

KGU may refer to:

- KGU (AM), a radio station (760 AM) licensed to Honolulu, Hawaii, United States
- KGU-FM, a radio station (99.5 FM) licensed to Honolulu, Hawaii
- Kampfgruppe gegen Unmenschlichkeit, an anti-communist group from West Berlin during the early Cold War
- Kansai Gaidai University, a private university in Japan
- Kanto Gakuin University, a private university in Japan
- Kumamoto Gakuen University, a private university in Japan
- Kwansei Gakuin University, a private university in Japan
- Kyonggi University, a private university in South Korea
- IATA-Code of Keningau Airport
