= KHCM =

KHCM may refer to:

- KHCM (AM), a radio station (880 AM) licensed to Honolulu, Hawaii, United States
- KHCM-FM, a radio station (97.5 FM) licensed to Honolulu, Hawaii, United States
