= KLHT =

KLHT may refer to:

- KLHT (AM), a radio station (1040 AM) licensed to serve Honolulu, Hawaii, United States
- KLHT-FM, a radio station (91.5 FM) licensed to serve Honolulu, Hawaii, United States
- King Low Heywood Thomas, a private, co-educational day school in Stamford, Connecticut
