= Billy V =

Media personality in Hawaii, United States

William "Billy V" Van Osdol
- Education: Konawaena High School, University of Hawaiʻi
- Awards: Moe Keale "Aloha Is" Award
- Presenting career
- Show: Morning Jam, Nāʻau Therapy
- Stations: KCCN-FM, KINE-FM
- Network: SummitMedia
- Show: Hawaii News Now-Sunrise
- Stations: KGMB, KHNL, KFVE
- Network: CBS, NBC
- Country: United States
- Website: www.billyv.net

William "Billy V" Van Osdol is a veteran radio broadcast personality, television reporter and personality, entertainer, emcee, and actor in Honolulu, Hawaii. He has been at the forefront of numerous events in the Hawaii entertainment, hospitality, and sports industries, and most notably at many of Hawaii's biggest events including the Na Hoku Hanohano Awards and the Merrie Monarch Festival.

Billy V has also played Ed Romero, a conservation officer, from 2012 to 2018 on the CBS hit police action TV series, Hawaii Five-0.

== Radio ==
=== KCCN FM100 (1990–2006) ===
Billy V was instrumental in developing the KCCN-FM radio station as its first music director, 2nd program director and eventually morning personality. He helped develop the programming with Jacqueline Leilani "Honolulu Skylark" Rossetti, assisted in building studios and production rooms, implemented on-air programs, and worked with initial sales teams before being called to assist on Hawaiian 105 KINE-FM. During his time on the station, KCCN-FM become Honolulu's No. 1 radio station in 2000, according to Neilson.

=== Hawaiian 105 KINE (2006–2021) ===
In 1996; after much success at KCCN-FM, Billy V was asked to assist KCCN-FM's sister station Hawaiian 105 KINE by moving to host their morning show. After being solo for five years, in 2011 Billy V started the morning show, Nāʻau Therapy, by having popular radio announcer Mele Apana join the show. The show earned the station's highest ratings in years. Billy V along with Mele Apana had been largely responsible at that time for bringing excitement and ratings back to the Hawaiian music format and Hawaiian 105 KINE.

In 2014, Billy V left in solidarity with his co-host on Hawaiian 105 KINE after Mele Apana was released by the station; and was picked up by Hawaii CBS and NBC television station Hawaii News Now.

In 2019, while working at Hawaii News Now, Billy V returned to Hawaiian 105 KINE for the Saturday noon - 6:00 pm timeslot playing songs from Hawaii's top musicians and sharing behind-the-scenes stories from celebrities and other special guests.

In 2021, SummitMedia Corporation, owner of Hawaiian 105 Hawaiian 105 KINE-FM, laid off many staff including Hawaii radio personalities Billy V, Mele Apana, Shannon Scott, and Wayne Maria.

== Television ==
=== Hawaii News Now ===
In September 2007, News Director Chris Archer asked Billy V to join the morning television news broadcast Sunrise on Hawaii News Now, as a spotlight entertainment reporter from the Hawaiian 105 KINE studios while still doing the morning radio show. Periodically, he would fill in for breaking news, traffic, and weather segments. He was asked to join the Hawaii News Now-Sunrise team full-time in January 2015 after a meeting with then Hawaii News Now General Manager Rick Blagiardi.

His role at the TV station lead to anchoring prominent Hawaii broadcasts including the Queen Liliuokalani Hula Competition, the Merrie Monarch Festival and the Na Hoku Hanohano Awards.

Billy V was asked in February 2023 to co-anchor the newly started Hawaii News Now Sunrise weekends, where he also does traffic and weather reporting. This would be the first Sunrise weekend show for Hawaii News Now.

=== Na Hoku Hanohano Awards ===
Billy V has anchored the Hawaii Academy of Recording Arts' televised Hawaii music award ceremony, the Na Hoku Hanohano Awards, since 1996.

=== Hawaii Five-0 ===
Billy V has also played Ed Romero, a conservation officer, from 2012 to 2018 on the CBS police action TV series, Hawaii Five-0. He also emceed the Hawaii Five-0, Magnum P.I. and NCIS: Hawaiʻi world premiers from Waikiki Beach for all of the years those shows were on the air.

Year	Title	Role	Notes
2012	Hawaii Five-0	Ed Romero – HFD/Conservation Officer	Episode: "Huaka'i Kula"
2018	Hawaii Five-0	Ed Romero – HFD/Conservation Officer	Episode: "Aohe Mea Make I Ka Hewa; Make No I Ka Mihi Ole"

=== Past television events ===
- Na Hoku Hanohano Awards
- Merrie Monarch Festival
- Pop-Up Mākeke
- Lantern Floating Hawaii
- Queen Liliuokalani Hula Competition
- Miss Hawaii Scholarship Pageant
- NFL Pro Bowl
- SoFi Hawaii Bowl
- Hawaiian Slack Key Guitar Festival

== Sports ==
=== University of Hawaiʻi Athletics ===
In 1999, Billy V was asked to emcee the Rainbow Classic collegiate basketball tournament by sponsor Outrigger Hotels & Resorts. Immediately after the tournament he was asked to join the University of Hawaiʻi Athletics Department as the game day activities coordinator, consisting of game announcing all non-official game announcements and promotions for pre-game, time outs and post game; client relations and game day coordination. Currently, Billy V can be seen and heard during University of Hawaiʻi sports including women's volleyball, men's basketball and football.

== Other works ==
- Hawaiian Airlines in-flight program
- Honolulu Festival
