= KPOI-FM =

- Honolulu, Hawaii; United States
- Frequency: 105.9 MHz
- Branding: 105.9 The Wave

Programming
- Format: Soft adult contemporary

Ownership
- Owner: Pacific Media Group; (Pacific Radio Group, Inc.)
- Sister stations: KDDB, KQMQ-FM, KUMU-FM

History
- First air date: November 20, 2000
- Call sign meaning: Poi, a puree of vegetables in Hawaiian cuisine

Technical information
- Licensing authority: FCC
- Facility ID: 33450
- Class: C
- ERP: 100,000 watts horizontal 92,000 watts vertical
- HAAT: 599 meters (1,965 ft)
- Transmitter coordinates: 21.394°N 158.098°W

Links
- Public license information: Public file; LMS
- Webcast: Listen Live
- Website: 1059thewavefm.com

KPOI-FM (105.9 MHz) is a commercial radio station in Honolulu, Hawaii, known as "105.9 The Wave, Hawaii's Relaxing Favorites." The Pacific Media Group outlet broadcasts a soft adult contemporary radio format, switching to Christmas music for part of November and December. The radio studios are in Downtown Honolulu.

KPOI-FM has an effective radiated power (ERP) of 100,000 watts horizontal polarization, 92,000 watts vertical. The transmitter is on Palehua Road in Akupu, amid the towers for other Honolulu-area FM and TV stations.

== History ==
=== Seeking an FM license ===
Entertainment entrepreneur Edward "Chip" Uehara-Tilton and veteran Hawaii radio personality Jacqueline L. "Skylark" Rossetti created "Kasa Moku Ka Pawa Broadcasting" (KMKP), a Delaware Corporation, with plans for starting an FM station. The Federal Communications Commission opened a new Class C license window for Honolulu in early 1987. KMKP was formed to pursue that opportunity, vying with 13 other original applicants.

Under the FCC policy of integration and diversification of broadcast ownership, almost 11 years of documenting and negotiating took place. KMKP's business plan for a Hawaii oriented live music and roving DJ format prevailed as an FCC Broadcast Station Construction Permit was issued February 8, 1999. The transmitter and antenna equipment was designed by engineers Clayton Caughill and son Cris, and constructed by JAMPRO and Broadcast Electronics. After initial tests were conducted, a license to broadcast for BLH-20000706ADU awarded July 21, 2000. At the same time, KMKP sold the license, but not the business plan.

=== Active and Alternative Rock ===
The station signed on the air on November 20, 2000, as Active Rock KAHA, known "Lava Rock." The format changed in 2002 when the station shifted to classic rock. The station also picked up the KPOI call sign in 2004 after the previous KPOI flipped formats to talk radio. This is the third station to adopt the KPOI call letters, first used on the AM band as a Top 40, then later used on its FM sister at 97.5, when it was billed as KPOI 98 Rock playing Album Rock and later alternative rock prior to its sale to Salem Communications in 2004.

In 2012, 105.9 KPOI shifted back to an alternative rock format, with a playlist focused on 1980s & 1990s titles, along with some new alternative. KPOI shifted its format again in late October 2013, focusing on 1990s alternative rock with some contemporary alternative songs. In 2014, the station rebranded as "Alt 105.9 – Hawaii's Real Alternative". The station also began transmitting on Charter Spectrum digital cable channel 857 for the entire state of Hawaii.

Around June 2010, KPOI made a shift in format, adding to the playlist more B-side tracks, 1980s rock, 1990s alternative, complete/uncut songs, and metal. The station's playlist became a mixture of 1980s rock & alternative, 1990s alternative, & some contemporary alternative rock. KPOI rebranded as "Alt 105.9" on August 13, 2014.

=== Soft Adult Contemporary ===
On May 1, 2020, KPOI exited a two-way Alternative battle with rival KUCD after six years and struggling ratings. It became "105.9 The Wave", playing soft adult contemporary music. It began competing with established AC stations KSSK-FM and KRTR-FM. KPOI leans softer than those stations with some Hawaiian music elements. Some of the last songs played before the transition included a cover of "Running Up That Hill" by Meg Myers and "Tom's Diner" by Suzanne Vega.

== Previous Logos ==
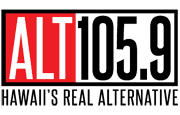
