= KDEO =

KDEO may refer to:

- KECR 910 AM, a radio station in El Cajon, California, United States that previously used the KDEO calls from 1955 to 1977
- KKNE 940 AM, a defunct radio station in Waipahu, Hawaii, United States that previously used the KDEO calls from 1980 to 1994
- KDDB 102.7 FM, a radio station in Waipahu, Hawaii, United States that previously used the KDEO-FM calls from 1990 to 1998
