= KKBG =

Radio station in Hilo, Hawaii

- Hilo, Hawaii; United States
- Broadcast area: Hilo, Hawaii
- Frequency: 97.9 MHz
- Branding: KBIG 97.9 & 106.1

Programming
- Format: Hot adult contemporary

Ownership
- Owner: Pacific Radio Group, Inc.
- Sister stations: KAPA, KPVS, KHLO, KLEO, KAGB, KLUA

History
- First air date: August 5, 1980
- Former call signs: KKEA (1971–1980)

Technical information
- Licensing authority: FCC
- Facility ID: 52468
- Class: C1
- ERP: 51,000 watts
- HAAT: -19.7 meters
- Transmitter coordinates: 19°50′19″N 155°6′43″W
- Repeater: 106.1 KLEO

Links
- Public license information: Public file; LMS
- Webcast: Listen Live
- Website: kbigfm.com

KKBG (97.9 FM) is a radio station broadcasting a hot adult contemporary format. Licensed to Hilo, Hawaii, United States, the station serves the Hilo area. The station is currently owned by Pacific Radio Group, Inc.

== History ==
The Mauna Kea Broadcasting Company, owned by Saul Levine, received a construction permit for a new radio station to be built in Hilo on May 14, 1969. The station would have to wait more than a decade before finally signing on. Continual extensions of the construction permit were granted until 1980, when the call sign was changed to KKBG. The Big Island finally got FM radio on June 5, 1980, when the station debuted on a test basis with an easy listening format. Official program service debuted two months later. Mauna Kea Broadcasting also owned KJYE (96.3 FM) on Oahu.

Levine sold KKBG to Philip L. Brewer in 1982; Brewer's only other broadcasting holding was a station in Windsor, Colorado. The station changed formats after the sale to rock. Brewer sold his Colorado properties in 1988 and expanded on the Big Island by acquiring Hilo AM outlet KHLO the next year.

In 1998, Brewer sold its four Big Island radio properties to Emerald City Radio Partners for $3.8 million; by this time, the station was already adult contemporary. Emerald City became Maverick Media, and its stations were sold to Pacific Radio Group; its simultaneous purchases of two clusters caused major radio station ownership realignment on the Big Island.
