= KRTR =

KRTR may refer to:

- KRTR-FM, a radio station (96.3 FM) licensed to serve Kailua, Hawaii, United States
- KPRP (AM), a defunct radio station (650 AM) formerly licensed to serve Honolulu, Hawaii, which held the call sign KRTR from 2005 to 2013
- KRTR (Wyoming), a defunct radio station (1490 AM) licensed to Thermopolis, Wyoming
