= KPVS =

Radio station in Hilo, Hawaii

KPVS/KLUA
- KPVS: Hilo, Hawaii KLUA: Kailua-Kona, Hawaii; United States
- Broadcast area: KPVS: Hilo, Hawaii; KLUA: Kailua-Kona, Hawaii
- Frequencies: KPVS: 95.9 (MHz); KLUA: 93.9 (MHz)
- Branding: The Beat Hawaii

Programming
- Format: Top 40/CHR

Ownership
- Owner: Pacific Radio Group, Inc.
- Sister stations: KKON, KKBG, KHLO, KAPA

History
- First air date: KPVS: August 14, 1995; KLUA: February 8, 1991

Technical information
- Facility ID: KPVS: 51240; KLUA: 60504
- Class: KPVS: C2; KLUA: C0
- ERP: KPVS: 39,000 watts KLUA: 7,300 watts
- HAAT: KPVS: −78.0 meters (−255.9 ft); KLUA: 921.1 meters (3,022 ft)
- Transmitter coordinates: 19.836°N 155.109°W

Links
- Website: thebeathawaii.com

KPVS and KLUA are commercial radio stations in the island of Hawaiʻi, broadcasting to the Hilo and Kailua-Kona areas on 95.9 MHz FM and 93.9 MHz FM, respectively. The two stations simulcast as The Beat, a top 40/CHR format.

On April 1, 2016, the simulcast adopted its present format, at the time retaining the "Native FM" name.
