= KPRP =

KPRP may refer to:

- Kampuchean People's Revolutionary Party (KPRP)
- Communist Party of Poland (1918–1925), Polish: Komunistyczna Partia Robotnicza Polski
- KPRP-LP, a low-power radio station (99.1 FM) licensed to serve Portland, Oregon, United States; see List of radio stations in Oregon
- KPRP (AM), a defunct radio station in Honolulu
- Keratinocyte Proline Rich Protein (KPRP)
