= KKOL =

KKOL may refer to:

- KKOL (AM), a radio station (1300 AM) licensed to Seattle, Washington, United States
- KKOL-FM, a radio station (107.9 FM) licensed to Aiea, Hawaii, United States
