= KAPA =

- Hilo, Hawaii; United States
- Frequency: 100.3 MHz
- Branding: Hawaiian FM

Programming
- Format: Hawaiian adult contemporary

Ownership
- Owner: Pacific Radio Group, Inc.
- Sister stations: KKON, KKBG, KPVS, KHLO

History
- First air date: 1987-11-06 (as KIPA-FM)
- Former call signs: KIPA-FM (1987–1992); KHWI (1992–1999)

Technical information
- Licensing authority: FCC
- Facility ID: 5254
- Class: C2
- ERP: 35,000 watts
- HAAT: −78.0 meters (−255.9 ft)
- Transmitter coordinates: 19°50′19″N 155°6′43″W

Links
- Public license information: Public file; LMS
- Webcast: Listen Live
- Website: kaparadio.com

KAPA (100.3 FM) is a radio station broadcasting a Hawaiian adult contemporary format. Licensed to Hilo, Hawaii, United States, the station serves the Hilo area. The station is currently owned by Pacific Radio Group, Inc.

== History ==
The station went on the air as KIPA-FM on November 6, 1987. On July 31, 1992, the station changed its call sign to KHWI. On October 21, 1999, KHWI changed calls to the current KAPA.
