= KHUI =

KHUI may refer to:

- KHUI (FM), a radio station (89.1 FM) licensed to serve Alamosa, Colorado, United States
- KGU-FM, a radio station (99.5 FM) licensed to serve Honolulu, Hawaii, United States, which held the call sign KHUI from 2002 to 2010
