= Gil Stratton =

American actor (1922–2008)

- Stratton in 2007
- Born: June 2, 1922; Brooklyn, New York, U.S.
- Died: October 11, 2008 (aged 86); Toluca Lake, California, U.S.
- Education: St. Lawrence University
- Occupations: Actor; Sportscaster
- Years active: 1941–2003
- Spouse: Dee Arlen (1961–2008) (his death)
- Children: 5

Gil Stratton Jr. (June 2, 1922 – October 11, 2008) was an American actor and sportscaster who was born in Brooklyn, New York. He most recently resided in Toluca Lake, California, until his death in 2008.

== Early life ==
Stratton was born June 2, 1922, in Brooklyn and attended Poly Prep. He later attended St. Lawrence University in Canton, New York, where he graduated with a bachelor's degree, and starred as a goalie on the SLU hockey team.

== Stage career ==
He first became interested in acting as a teenager. He debuted on Broadway at the age of 19 as Bud Hooper in the George Abbott musical Best Foot Forward. The musical ran from October 1, 1941, to July 4, 1942.

== Film career ==
As a result of Stratton's appearance in Best Foot Forward, Metro-Goldwyn-Mayer hired him as a contract player. His first role at MGM was in the film Girl Crazy with Mickey Rooney and Judy Garland, singing "Embraceable You" in a duet with Garland.

After completing Girl Crazy, he had a short film hiatus due to having enlisted in the United States Army Air Corps upon the US entry to World War II. He later noted that he ended up spending much of his service umpiring baseball. During this time he began umpiring for the Pacific Coast League (PCL). While umpiring in the PCL he began using the line, "time to call 'em as I see 'em."

Following Stratton's discharge from the Army, he returned to films, appearing in such features as Stalag 17 (1953) (as the narrator Cookie), a role in The Wild One (1953), and Bundle of Joy (1956). He starred in a total of 40 films during his film career, sharing the big screen with other notable actors such as Cary Grant, Shirley Temple, Marilyn Monroe, and William Holden.

== Radio/television actor ==
In addition to acting in several films, Stratton began working as a radio actor in the late 1940s, performing in such shows as Lux Radio Theater, The Great Gildersleeve, and My Little Margie He worked opposite Judy Garland in the 1950 radio adaptation of The Wizard of Oz, and acted opposite Shirley Temple in a radio version of The Bachelor and the Bobby-Soxer.

In the 1950s, Stratton appeared in several episodes of Jack Webb's Dragnet. In 1956 he was in two episodes of the Yours Truly, Johnny Dollar radio drama, “The Laughing Matter” (as an ill-fated up-and-coming TV comedy actor) and “The Alder Matter” (as an insurance chief puzzled by suspicious behavior of a wealthy client). He also starred in Waldo, an unsold television pilot that aired as an episode of the 1960 anthology series New Comedy Showcase.

In the 1970s and 1980s he made occasional guest appearances on many television series, usually portraying a sports announcer.

== Sportscasting career ==
In 1954, Stratton was hired by Los Angeles television station KNXT (now KCBS-TV) as a sportscaster and sports news anchor. He spent sixteen years as sports anchor of the show The Big News during the 1960s and 1970s. This was the first hour-long news program for the region. While at KNXT, he became recognized for his signature phrase "Time to call 'em as I see 'em", which he had started saying during his years as a baseball umpire. Within a year, The Big News was earning a 28 percent ratings share in Los Angeles and the show format became the standard that was soon copied by other local TV stations across the country. Stratton was the last-surviving member of The Big News team prior to his death.

Stratton also served as a sportscaster for California CBS AM radio station, KNX 1070, from 1967 to 1984 and again from 1986 to 1997. He also worked at KTTV channel 11 in Los Angeles at various times in the 1970's and '80's.

While working for CBS Sports in both television and radio, Stratton covered the 1960 Summer Olympics from Rome. He also covered the NFL as "the voice" of the Los Angeles Rams in the 1960s, and called Major League Baseball games, Kentucky Derbies, and feature races from Santa Anita, Hollywood Park, and Del Mar. He also covered many other sports, such as hockey, tennis, track and field and golf.

Political and sports commentator Keith Olbermann worked with Stratton at both KCBS/KNXT and at KNX 1070. He said of Stratton, "There aren't many renaissance men in any age, but Gil was one of them." Stratton won five local Emmys during his television career, and was also awarded seven Golden Mike awards from the Radio-Television News Association.

== Retirement and later life ==
Stratton first retired from TV and radio in 1984, and traveled to the Big Island of Hawaii, where he became Owner/General Manager of a small radio station, 790 AM KKON, in Kealakekua, Hawaii. But being behind the desk was not for Stratton - he wanted to get behind the microphone again. Stratton sold the station to Bill Evans and returned again to KNX 1070 radio in 1986 as a weekend sports anchor. He retired again in 1997 but continued doing charity work, such as hosting many charity golf tournaments to raise funds for Henry Mayo Hospital in Santa Clarita, California. The hospital later named a newborn nursery after him in appreciation of his work. He also taught classes in broadcasting at California State University Northridge.

Stratton died on October 11, 2008, at the age of 86.
