= Hawaiian Island Charts =

Music chart

The Hawaiian Island weekly top 36 charts were weekly charts compiled from tabulations of listener ballots sent into Honolulu-based radio station Radio Free Hawaii, 102.7 FM. All genres of music were eligible for each week's chart, including current rock, pop and rap, as well as oldies, country, Hawaiian, jazz and classical music.

The system was unique, as the radio playlists were chosen completely by the listeners. The charts existed 1991–1997.

== See also ==
- Record chart
- Hawaii
