= KDDB =

Radio station in Waipahu–Honolulu, Hawaii

- Waipahu, Hawaii; United States
- Broadcast area: Honolulu
- Frequency: 102.7 MHz
- Branding: 102.7 Da Bomb

Programming
- Format: Contemporary hit radio

Ownership
- Owner: Pacific Radio Group, Inc.
- Sister stations: KPOI-FM; KQMQ-FM; KUMU-FM

History
- First air date: November 23, 1988
- Former call signs: KDEO (1990–1998); KKHN (1998–2000)
- Call sign meaning: "Da Bomb"

Technical information
- Licensing authority: FCC
- Facility ID: 38244
- Class: C
- ERP: 61,000 watts (horiz.); 60,000 watts (vert.)
- HAAT: 577 meters (1,893 ft)
- Transmitter coordinates: 21°23′49.0″N 158°5′58.0″W

Links
- Public license information: Public file; LMS
- Webcast: Listen live
- Website: 1027dabomb.net

KDDB (102.7 FM) is a commercial radio station licensed to Waipahu, Hawaii, United States, and serving the Honolulu market. Owned by Pacific Media Group, it carries a Contemporary hit radio format is known as "102.7 Da Bomb". The studios and offices are on Bishop Street in Honolulu.

The transmitter is located off Palehua Road in Akupu. KDDB also transmits on Oceanic Spectrum digital channel 854 for the entire state of Hawaii.

== History ==
The station signed on the air on November 23, 1988. It was a country music station using the call sign KDEO. In 1991, the station flipped to an eclectic freeform format as "Radio Free Hawaii." It proved to be popular with listeners, who voted via ballot boxes in various locations across O'ahu and Maui and via their website. These votes were compiled into the Hawaiian Island Music Report (Hawaiian Island Charts).

=== Financial problems ===
The owner of KDEO entered into an operating agreement with KRTR-FM in November 1994, citing financial troubles, the format was changed to classic rock as "The Blaze". The Blaze proved unpopular, and the station returned to Radio Free Hawaii by May 1995.

Despite the popularity of the voting-based format, Radio Free Hawaii had trouble generating revenue. The station's manager, "Sheriff" Norm Winter, stated in an interview years later that this was due to his refusal to subscribe to the Arbitron ratings system, as the fee to subscribe was $50,000 at the time. Advertisers at the time relied mainly on the Arbitron ratings to buy airtime, and were not impressed by Winters' own in-house research showing that the station was in the top 3 stations in Oahu listenership. As a result, the station went deeper and deeper into debt.

The station, under Winter's leadership, was instrumental in starting the first annual rock festival in Hawaii, the Big Mele.

=== Cool 102.7/Double K Country ===
On March 7, 1997, the station was acquired by Caribou Broadcasting. The new owners dropped the Radio Free Hawaii format for an rhythmic adult contemporary format. It was known as "Cool 102.7" KHUL.

However, the rhythmic AC sounds didn't attract enough listeners or ratings. In 1998, the station returned to country music as KKHN, "Double K Country".

=== 102.7 Da Bomb ===
KDDB logo was used from 2000 until 2016.

On November 17, 2000, at 3:00 p.m. the country format ended. The owners moved KQMQ-FM's Rhythmic Top 40 format to the 102.7 frequency. After stunting with a loop of The Gap Band's You Dropped a Bomb on Me, the station relaunched as "102.7 Da Bomb." The first song was "What's Your Fantasy" by Ludacris.

In late 2000, the call sign were changed to KDDB. At first, KDDB, like most other Rhythmic start-ups, had featured hip-hop music as a core component of the playlist. But it scaled back on the genre after KIKI and KQMQ both flipped formats, along with the changing taste in its listeners. Da Bomb began playing other musical genres, including the EDM culture. (KIKI later returned to Rhythmic as KUBT in September 2016.) Although KDDB's slogan boasted "All The Hits Now!," the station's playlist featured a unique blend of current Rhythmic Pop/Dance hits. Non-rhythmic Top 40 hits were not included.

=== Mainstream Top 40 ===
In July 2018, the station transitioned to a Top 40/CHR presentation with the inclusion of pop hits. It began to compete with 104.3 KPHW, which also shifted to Top 40/CHR. That gave Honolulu two outlets with mainstream Top 40/CHR playlists, ending a five-year drought in Honolulu. The market had two mainstream CHRs for the first time since 1997. The station was owned by the Ohana Broadcast Company.

Pacific Media Group acquired the Ohana Broadcasting cluster effective September 1, 2019, bringing its station total across Hawai'i to 20 and giving it its first stations on O'ahu.

=== In the media ===
In a December 1983 episode of Magnum, P.I. titled "The Look", the 102.7 MHz frequency was used as the home of the fictitious KTDE, "K-Tide". The plot revolved around a female disc jockey working at that radio station.

In reality, the 102.7 MHz frequency was not broadcasting at that time. There were no FM stations in Honolulu found above 97.5 MHz.
