= KUMU-FM =

Rhythmic adult contemporary radio station in Honolulu, Hawaii

Honolulu, Hawaii; United States
- Broadcast area: Oahu
- Frequency: 94.7 MHz
- Branding: 94.7 KUMU; (pronounced "koo-moo")

Programming
- Language: English
- Format: Rhythmic adult contemporary
- Affiliations: Compass Media Networks

Ownership
- Owner: Pacific Radio Group, Inc.
- Sister stations: KDDB; KPOI-FM; KQMQ-FM

History
- First air date: June 30, 1967
- Former call signs: KFOA-FM (1967–1971)
- Call sign meaning: From the Hawaiian word for "teacher"

Technical information
- Facility ID: 31601
- Class: C
- ERP: 100,000 watts
- HAAT: 565 meters (1,854 ft)
- Transmitter coordinates: 21°23′33″N 158°5′48″W

Links
- Webcast: Listen Live
- Website: kumu.com

KUMU-FM (94.7 MHz) - branded as 94.7 KUMU (pronounced koo-moo) - is a commercial radio station in Honolulu, Hawaii. It airs a rhythmic adult contemporary radio format and is owned by Pacific Radio Group, Inc. The radio studios and offices are on Bishop Street in Downtown Honolulu.

The transmitter is on the Hilton Hawaiian Village Hotel, on Kalia Road in Waikiki. KUMU-FM has an effective radiated power (ERP) of 100,000 watts. The station also transmits on Oceanic Time Warner Cable digital channel 870 for the entire state of Hawaii.

== History ==
KUMU-FM logo was used from 1999 until 2010.

The station signed on the air on June 30, 1967, as KFOA-FM, becoming the 3rd FM station in Honolulu. It was owned by the Royal Hawaiian Radio Company, and originally had an effective radiated power of 30,000 watts, less than a third of its current output. The studios and transmitter were located at the Hilton Hawaiian Village.

In 1971, KFOA was acquired by the John Hutton Corporation, which also owned AM station KUMU (now KHKA). On August 16, 1971, the station became KUMU-FM, airing a beautiful music format, also found on KUMU 1500. The two stations enjoyed high ratings for several decades, but in the 1990s, the easy listening format began to age, while most advertisers seek young to middle aged clients. KUMU-AM-FM would add more vocals and scaled back the instrumentals.

In 1997, KUMU-AM-FM were bought by Pacific West Broadcasting for $2.8 million. KUMU-FM shifted to soft adult contemporary music and its AM sister station began its own programming.

By 2010, KUMU's direction transitioned to rhythmic adult contemporary music as "Hawaii's Old Skool" (later replaced with "The Rhythm of Hawaii" in 2014). KUMU added a nightly "Quiet Storm" show featuring Rico, which replaced the syndicated "Delilah" program. In addition, its AM sister station once again became a simulcast for the FM station before changing its format and call sign in September 2010, following the sale of the AM station.

KUMU-FM is usually among the top five stations in the Honolulu Nielsen ratings.
