= KQMQ-FM =

Hawaiian contemporary hit radio station in Honolulu

Coordinates: 21°23′45″N 158°05′58″W

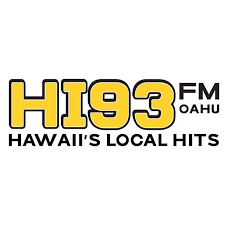
- Honolulu, Hawaii; United States
- Broadcast area: Oahu
- Frequency: 93.1 MHz
- Branding: HI93

Programming
- Language: English
- Format: Hawaiian contemporary hit radio

Ownership
- Owner: Pacific Media Group; (Pacific Radio Group, Inc.)
- Sister stations: KDDB; KPOI-FM; KUMU-FM

History
- First air date: April 1, 1967
- Former call signs: KGMB-FM (1967–1973); KGMQ (1973–1976); KQMQ (1976–1984)

Technical information
- Licensing authority: FCC
- Facility ID: 16745
- Class: C
- ERP: 100,000 watts
- HAAT: 565 meters (1,854 ft)

Links
- Public license information: Public file; LMS
- Webcast: Listen live
- Website: hi93oahu.com

KQMQ-FM (93.1 FM) is a commercial radio station in Honolulu, Hawaii, United States, known as "HI93". It is owned by the Pacific Media Group and it broadcasts a format of contemporary Hawaiian and reggae music. The programming is led by local radio vet Kelsey Yogi. The station's studios are on Alakea Street in Downtown Honolulu.

KQMQ-FM has an effective radiated power (ERP) of 100,000 watts, the maximum for most FM stations. The transmitter is on Palehua Road near Palikea Ridge in Akupu. The station is also heard on Oceanic Spectrum digital channel 868 for the entire state of Hawaii.

== History ==
=== Rock, Top 40, and CHR ===
The station signed on the air on April 1, 1967, as the 4th FM station in the state. Its original call sign was KGMB-FM and was the FM counterpart to KGMB (590 AM, now KSSK). The two radio stations, along with KGMB-TV channel 9, were owned by the Pacific Broadcasting Company, led by J. Howard Worrell. The station changed its call letters to KGMQ on September 1, 1973, shortly after future Hawaiian congressman Cecil Heftel bought the KGMB-AM-FM-TV cluster. It became an album rock station in 1976, & changed its call letters to KQMQ after it was spun off from Heftel to the Aloha Broadcasting Company. Gene Davis was Program Director and hosted morning drive time while Lee Abrams was the consultant. Among the disc jockeys were Ron Wood, Bob Cole and Noel Grey. It was one of the first stations in Hawaii to include Hawaiian contemporary music in its regular playlist, giving exposure to groups like Kalapana, Cecilio and Kapono, and Keola and Kapono Beamer.

By 1982, KQMQ inherited the Top 40/CHR format from KKUA and continued it into the 1990s. On December 18, 2000, at 5 am, it flipped to all-1980s and 90s music, with the Top 40 format previously on KQMQ moving over to sister station KDDB. KQMQ was then known as "93.1 The Q". In 2005, KQMQ returned to Top 40 hits with a modern adult contemporary lean as "93.1 The Zone". During its second run as a Top 40/CHR, KQMQ-FM was the first station in the U.S. to play Linkin Park's "New Divide". This was certified by Mediabase 24/7.

=== Reggae and Hawaiian Contemporary ===
In early 2011, management was planning a major change. The station sent out a decoy media release that KQMQ would switch to a new format that would be Traditional Hawaiian "Nā Mele 93.1", a brand that is used at parent company Ohana Broadcasting's other outlets in Hawaii. On February 4, KQMQ dropped its Top 40/CHR format and began stunting with all-Bob Marley music during the weekend until February 6.

It then flipped to a format that consists of reggae and contemporary Hawaiian music, billing itself as "93.1 Da Pā'ina". The move to a Reggae-based format made this the second of its kind in the United States. February 6, was also Marley's birthday, which added to the timing of the flip. According to Program Director Rick Thomas, "Pa’ina’s mission to is to have fun and play the reggae and island jams people really want to hear". Thomas launched with Big Teeze as station voice and with Imaging Director John James. With this move, KQMQ competes with two other Hawaiian contemporary outlets that also feature reggae music in their presentation, KDNN and KCCN.

=== Pacific Media Group ===
Pacific Media Group acquired the Ohana Broadcasting cluster in June 2019. It owns 20 radio stations in Hawaii. The acquisition gives Pacific Media its first stations on O'ahu.

KQMQ-FM rebranded as "HI93" on March 9, 2020. The rebranding was made to match the similar "HI92.5" KLHI-FM on Kahului, Maui and “HI95” 95.9 KSRF, Poipu, Kaua’i.

=== Past personalities ===
KQMQ has been the home of several noted radio personalities including Chris Hughes, Augie Tulba (Da Augie Radio Show), Kimo Leahi, Austin Vali, Tony Taylor, Scotty B, Bridgette Sarchino, Sam The Man, Hawaiian Ryan, Leikia, Dan Cooke, Michael Qseng and Danielle Tucker (Morning Madness), Jeff Kino and Lois Miyashiro and Shawn Ho (The Morning Zoo), Justin Cruz, Wili Moku with Wild Kyle the traffic guy, Laurie Ann Solomon, Cliff Richards, Erika Engle, and Kari Steele.

Some other popular radio personalities that worked on KQMQ include: Brad Barrett, who also served as sister station KKUA Program Director, later moving to cross street competition KSSK-FM, Kimo Akane, Kriss Hart, Kevin "Bish" Bishop, Myk Powell, Lou Richards, Michael W. Perry, Mark "Mars Frehley" Marolt, Jon Kealoha, Shawn Ho, Jon E. Blaze, Candace Cruise, Kurt Williams, Kathy With A "K", Timster, Bruddah Bryan, Roro, Lisa D. and Steve Kelly, Wayne Dines as "Young Bobby Young" and Mark Morgann as the weekend SegueGuy.
