= KAGB =

- Waimea, Hawaii; United States
- Frequency: 99.1 MHz
- Branding: Hawaiian FM

Programming
- Format: Hawaiian AC

Ownership
- Owner: Pacific Radio Group, Inc.

History
- First air date: 1994-01-25

Technical information
- Licensing authority: FCC
- Facility ID: 35507
- Class: C0
- ERP: 7,300 watts
- HAAT: 911.7 meters
- Transmitter coordinates: 19°43′16″N 155°55′15″W

Links
- Public license information: Public file; LMS
- Webcast: Listen Live
- Website: kaparadio.com

KAGB (99.1 FM) is a radio station broadcasting a Hawaiian AC format simulcasting Hilo based KAPA. The station is licensed to Waimea, Hawaii, United States. The station is currently owned by Pacific Radio Group, Inc.
