= KHNR =

- Honolulu, Hawaii; United States
- Frequency: 690 kHz
- Branding: AM 690 and FM 94.3 The Answer

Programming
- Format: Conservative talk radio
- Network: Townhall News
- Affiliations: Salem Radio Network; Westwood One

Ownership
- Owner: Malama Media Group; (Malama Media Group, LLC)
- Sister stations: KGU; KGU-FM; KHCM; KHCM-FM; KKOL-FM

History
- First air date: May 14, 1947
- Former call signs: KVPO (CP); KULA (1947–1967); KKUA (1967–1987); KQMQ (1987–2002); KORL (2002–2006); KHCM (2006–2007)
- Call sign meaning: "Hawaii's News Radio"

Technical information
- Licensing authority: FCC
- Facility ID: 16742
- Class: B
- Power: 10,000 watts
- Transmitter coordinates: 21°17′29.7″N 157°51′39″W
- Translator: 94.3 K232FL (Honolulu)

Links
- Public license information: Public file; LMS
- Webcast: Listen live
- Website: theanswerhawaii.com

KHNR (690 AM) is a commercial radio station in Honolulu, Hawaii. It is owned by the Malama Media Group and it broadcasts a conservative talk format. The studios and offices are on North King Street in Honolulu's Kalihi district.

KHNR is powered at 10,000 watts, using a non-directional antenna. The transmitter is on Ahui Street in the Kakaako district of Honolulu, on Māmala Bay. Programming is also heard on 250-watt FM translator K232FL at 94.3 MHz.

== History ==
=== KULA and KKUA ===
The station signed on the air on May 14, 1947. Its original call sign was KULA. It was an affiliate of the ABC Radio Network and carried its schedule of dramas, comedies, news and sports during the "Golden Age of Radio". It was owned by the Pacific Frontier Broadcasting Company with the studios at 1525 Kapiolani Boulevard.

During the 1960s, 1970s and early 1980s, the station had the call sign KKUA, playing Top 40 hits, aimed at Honolulu's young listeners. In the 1980s, the Top 40 format moved to sister station 93.1 KQMQ-FM, with KKUA 690 switching to a full service, adult contemporary format. Then from 1987 until 1999, AM 690 simulcast the music on KQMQ-FM 93.1.

=== KORL and KHCM ===
On October 13, 1999, the station became the Hawaii affiliate for Radio Disney, making it a children's/contemporary hit radio station. It picked up the call letters of former Top 40 rival KORL on April 26, 2002. In 2005, Visionary Related Entertainment sold KORL.

The station then flipped it to a Japanese language format on December 31, 2003. In 2006, Salem Communications and KORL's owners swapped signals, and in the process moved the KHCM call sign and country music format over to the 690 from the 1180 frequency, which in turn became the new home for KORL.

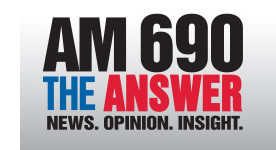
Logo before translator sign on

In 2004, Salem acquired rock music station KPOI-FM 105.9 and dropped the format. The FM station began airing a talk radio format, giving Hawaii its first FM talk station. KAIM (870 AM) became its simulcast after the switch was made. On September 3, 2007, KHCM switched to both 870 AM and 97.5 FM, keeping its country music format and taking the KHCM call letters for both stations.

=== KHNR ===
The talk radio format and KHNR call sign moved to 690 AM. KPOI-FM is now owned by Visionary Related Entertainment and airs a soft adult contemporary sound. Since 2007, KHNR has carried programming from the Salem Radio Network as a conservative talk radio station.

Like many Salem talk stations, KHNR calls itself "The Answer". That branding is also used on Salem's talk station in New York City, WNYM, and on its talk station in Los Angeles, KRLA.

The Salem Media Group announced on March 17, 2025, the sale of the company's remaining radio stations and digital assets in Honolulu. They were sold to the Malama Media Group. Malama said it would keep the stations in the same formats that Salem had.

== Programming ==
Most of KHNR's weekday schedule is nationally syndicated shows, largely from the Salem Radio Network including Hugh Hewitt, Mike Gallagher, Chris Stigall, Larry Elder, Scott Jennings and Alex Marlow. From Westwood One, KHNR also carries Mark Levin.
