= Kapena =

Kapena is a surname. Notable people with the surname include:

- Jonah Kapena (died 1868), royal advisor and statesman of the Kingdom of Hawaii
- John Mākini Kapena (1843–1887), politician, diplomat, and newspaper editor of the Kingdom of Hawaii

Given name

- Kapena Gushiken (born 2002), American football player
