= KLHT-FM =

- Honolulu, Hawaii; United States
- Broadcast area: Honolulu metropolitan area
- Frequency: 91.5 MHz
- Branding: KLHT-FM Honolulu

Programming
- Format: Contemporary worship; Christian talk and teaching

Ownership
- Owner: Calvary Chapel of Honolulu, Inc.
- Sister stations: KLHT

History
- First air date: February 13, 2016

Technical information
- Licensing authority: FCC
- Facility ID: 81538
- Class: C
- ERP: 100,000 watts
- HAAT: 564 meters (1,850 ft)
- Transmitter coordinates: 21°23′45″N 158°05′58″W

Links
- Public license information: Public file; LMS
- Webcast: Listen live
- Website: fm.KLight.org

KLHT-FM (91.5 FM) is a non-commercial radio station licensed to Honolulu, Hawaii, United States. The station is owned by Calvary Chapel of Honolulu, Inc., with studios and offices on Kono Mai Drive in Aiea. Its format is a mix of contemporary worship and Christian talk and teaching.

The transmitter is on Palehua Road in the Waiʻanae Range in Akupu, Hawaii.

== History ==
Calvary Chapel was already operating an AM station in Honolulu, KLHT 1040 AM. It wanted to add an FM station as well. It applied for a construction permit to build a station on the 91.5 MHz frequency in 1996, but it took 20 years to get the license and construct the station.

The station was assigned the KLHT-FM call sign by the Federal Communications Commission on July 29, 2014. KLHT-FM signed on the air on February 13, 2016.
