= KLHT (AM) =

- Honolulu, Hawaii; United States
- Frequency: 1040 kHz
- Branding: K-Light 1040 AM

Programming
- Format: Christian talk and teaching

Ownership
- Owner: Calvary Chapel Honolulu
- Sister stations: KLHT-FM

History
- First air date: March 15, 1957
- Former call signs: KHVH (1957–1978); KPOI (1978–1984); KIFH (1984–1985)
- Call sign meaning: K-Light

Technical information
- Licensing authority: FCC
- Facility ID: 8415
- Class: B
- Power: 10,000 watts
- Transmitter coordinates: 21°19′54.7″N 157°53′27″W

Links
- Public license information: Public file; LMS
- Webcast: Listen Live
- Website: klight.org

KLHT (1040 kHz), known as "K-Light 1040 AM", is a radio station in Honolulu, Hawaii, with a Christian talk and teaching format. The station is owned by Calvary Chapel of Honolulu, Inc., with studios and offices on Komo Mai Drive in Aiea. It broadcasts from a transmitter off Nimitz Highway, near the Ke'ehi Lagoon.

The 1040 frequency in Honolulu first broadcast as KHVH on March 15, 1957. It was founded by Henry J. Kaiser and named for its original location, the Hawaiian Village Hotel. KHVH eventually became the television sister to KHVH-TV (channel 13, later channel 4) until they were split in 1973. In the 1960s and 1970s, KHVH was a news and sports station using CBS Radio News and NBC's News and Information Service.

As part of a settlement, KHVH moved to 990 kHz in 1978, and what had been KPOI on 1380 kHz moved to 1040. The station aired soft adult contemporary and oldies formats before switching to religious programming on March 1, 1984, as KIFH. Calvary Chapel of Honolulu acquired the station in 1985 and relaunched it as KLHT "K-Light". KLHT-FM was added in 2016.

== History ==
=== KHVH ===
On September 8, 1956, Kaiser Hawaiian Village Radio, Inc., applied to the Federal Communications Commission (FCC) for permission to build a new 5,000-watt radio station on 1040 kHz in Honolulu. The FCC granted the permit on February 6, at which time it was announced that the station would be built in the penthouse of its namesake, the Hawaiian Village Hotel, owned by industrialist Henry J. Kaiser. Kaiser also had an outstanding permit for television channel 13 in Honolulu. The fact that this was Honolulu's 10th AM radio station made some competitors chafe. KIKI executives filed a petition with the FCC, claiming a new radio station was not in the public interest and that Honolulu now had more stations than Cleveland.

The station signed on the air as KHVH on March 15, 1957, three days before the expected date of March 18. Kaiser found KIKI's accusations meritless. Though Kaiser was initially allowed to let the station broadcast, on April 5 it reversed course, rescinded the approval, and ordered KHVH off the air as of 1 a.m. on April 8. After the FCC's ruling, the station laid off 10 of its 35 employees. The commission denied the protest on April 26, allowing KHVH to return to the air. In reversing the decision, it found that Congress did not authorize the commission to license new stations on the basis of market competition. Hal Lewis, better known on the radio as J. Akuhead Pupule, was the executive vice president of the new Kaiser broadcasting operation in Honolulu.

Simultaneously, Kaiser entered television by building KHVH-TV channel 13 in 1957. It was initially an independent station reliant on movies. This changed the next year when Kaiser acquired KULA-TV (channel 4), Honolulu's ABC affiliate, which merged with KHVH-TV to become KULA-TV on channel 4. KULA's old Ala Moana Boulevard studios were retained for the combined operation, freeing up room at the Hawaiian Village for eight new suites.

By 1960, Kaiser's interests in Hawaii were diverse and far-reaching. In addition to the KHVH stations and the Hawaiian Village Hotel that was their namesake, he developed Hawaii Kai on eastern Oʻahu as well as a cement plant and a hospital. His influence led the Advertiser to ask in a December 1959 editorial, "Who's Running Hawaii?" Kaiser soon cast his gaze to broadcasting on the U.S. mainland. In 1962, he filed for stations in the UHF band in Chicago, Detroit, Los Angeles, San Francisco, and Burlington, New Jersey, near Philadelphia. His plans called for seven TV stations—the maximum one company could own at the time—with the stations in Honolulu and Hilo counting as two of the seven. Kaiser Industries announced the creation of Kaiser Broadcasting, a dedicated subsidiary of the company, to house the firm's broadcasting interests in September 1964.

The KHVH stations would not be among them for long. That October, Kaiser announced the $3 million sale of the KHVH stations and KHJK-TV to Lawrence S. Berger, who had experience running stations in Wyoming and Montana. The transaction also included a construction permit for an FM radio station. The acquisition by Berger's company, Western Telestations, was completed in December.

Berger accepted an offer from the Starr Broadcasting Company of New Orleans to sell KHVH-TV in March 1971; Berger would have bought KHVH radio from Western Telestations in a concurrent transaction. The deal fell apart that August, but Starr agreed to acquire KHVH-TV in November 1972. The sale closed on August 1, 1973; with the KHVH stations now under separate owners, channel 4 became KITV Berger would later regret not holding on to the television stations; in 1979, he said, "It was a mistake as far as money, at least. Who knew ABC would end up with Happy Days instead of the junk stuff we had in those days?"

In the 1960s and 1970s, KHVH became a radio station specializing in information. In 1965, it debuted the morning show Information Central, later expanded to afternoons. On January 2, 1969, KHVH began providing an all-news radio format during the day using CBS Radio News, becoming Hawaii's first such station in the format. The station also aired a nightly call-in show, Viewpoint, and in 1974 it broadcast the impeachment proceedings against Richard Nixon, accruing $7,500 in telephone charges. When NBC launched its News and Information Service (NIS) in 1975, KHVH began airing that around the clock, reducing its use of CBS features. NIS programming was received in Hawaii from the network's San Francisco affiliate, KNBR. In addition to news, KHVH offered play-by-play from San Francisco professional sports teams and the Minnesota Vikings, added when the San Francisco 49ers began losing and became less saleable. Even after NBC announced the discontinuation of NIS, Berger announced he was committed to the all-new format, and KHVH added an affiliation with ABC Radio, giving KHVH a tie to ABC, CBS, and NBC.

=== KPOI ===
In the 1970s, KHVH and KPOI (1380 AM) both made applications to improve their facilities. KPOI applied for 990 kHz wit 10,000 watts, while KHVH sought 1010 kHz with 10,000 watts. These applications were mutually exclusive and designated for comparative hearing by the FCC in March 1976. In 1977, the FCC approved a license exchange whereby KPOI would move to 1040 kHz and KHVH would move to 990. The switch took place in October, bringing KPOI's soft adult contemporary format to the 1040 frequency.

Communico Oceanic Corp. sold KPOI and its accompanying FM station, KHSS 97.5, to Florida-based Sudbrink Broadcasting in December 1978. KPOI was flipped to oldies by the new ownership. However, in approving the sale, the FCC refused a normal-term renewal of the stations' broadcast licenses due to the company's poor minority hiring record, which Sudbrink improved sufficiently to win a total three-year license. By the early 1980s, KPOI AM simulcast the FM, which also had the KPOI call sign and was broadcasting a rock format known as 98 Rock.

The 1040 facility was broadcast from a tower on Emmeline Place in Kalihi Valley, resulting in complaints to local radio and television reception. As a consequence, in 1983 the station moved to a tower in Waikiki.

=== As a religious station ===
On March 1, 1984, Sudbrink split KPOI AM from the FM, which retained the call sign, and flipped it to a religious format as KIFH. The next year, Sudbrink sold the station to Calvary Chapel of Honolulu for $650,000. The new ownership relaunched KIFH as KLHT, "K-Light", on August 1, 1985. It featured a format of Christian praise music as well as national talk and teaching programs.

In 1988, the lease on KLHT's existing tower site was not renewed, forcing the station to move to the tower of Billy Graham's KAIM AM in Kaimuki. The station broadcast at one point from a tower in Waiawa, but it could not use its full 10,000 watts of power to protect an FCC monitoring station.

Calvary Chapel of Honolulu applied in 1996 to start an FM station on 91.5 MHz. The FCC adjudicated Calvary's bid and two competing applications for the frequency in 2011, awarding it to Calvary, and dismissed a competing applicant's application for review in 2015. KLHT-FM 91.5, "Worship and the Word Radio", began broadcasting on February 13, 2016.

== Programming ==
KLHT programming consists of Christian talk and teaching shows with some contemporary worship music. Many Calvary Chapel pastors are featured, including The Word for Today with Chuck Smith, A New Beginning with Greg Laurie, Somebody Loves You with Raul Ries and As We Gather with Bill Stonebraker, senior pastor of Calvary Chapel Honolulu. The station also airs live broadcasts of Calvary Chapel Honolulu's Sunday morning and evening services.

National religious shows include Focus on the Family with Jim Daly, Truth for Life with Alistair Begg, Insight for Living with Chuck Swindoll, Love Worth Finding with Adrian Rogers, Turning Point with David Jeremiah, Let My People Think with Ravi Zacharias, and Thru the Bible with the late J. Vernon McGee.
