= KKON =

Radio station in Kealakekua, Hawaii (1969–2018)

- Kealakekua, Hawaii; United States
- Frequency: 790 kHz

Ownership
- Owner: First Assembly King's Cathedral and Chapels

History
- First air date: September 28, 1969
- Last air date: June 13, 2018
- Call sign meaning: Kona

Technical information
- Facility ID: 70382
- Class: B
- Power: 5,000 watts (unlimited)
- Transmitter coordinates: 19°31′10″N 155°55′08″W

KKON (790 AM) was a radio station licensed to serve Kealakekua, Hawaii, United States. The station was last owned by First Assembly King's Cathedral and Chapels.

== History ==
=== KEKO/KONA ===
Although Federal Communications Commission (FCC) records list KKON as a separate station, functionally it was the direct successor to an earlier station on the same frequency.

The original station to operate at 790 kHz from Kealakekua was KEKO, owned by the Mauna Loa Broadcasting Company. KEKO signed on November 1, 1963 and was the first station on the Big Island outside of windward Hilo. The station was affiliated with Hilo's KHBC and KGMB in Honolulu. Its block programming format included a daily Filipino program and daily marlin report, as well as a variety of music and news on the hour. The tower sat behind Kona's police station in the foothills of Mount Hualalai. In November 1965, KEKO changed its network to the All Islands Radio Network, whose key station was KGU; new call letters of KONA were assigned to the station that month.

Two Oahu residents, Saul Gould and William Mullen, bought stock in Mauna Loa Broadcasting Company in September 1967. A month later, the company began to publish a weekly newspaper, the Kona Star, which it said was the area's first "full-sized" paper; at the same time, Robert Bowman was appointed KONA station director. By the launch of the Star, KONA was negotiating for studio space in the new Kona Hilton hotel, a power increase to 5,000 watts, and a relocation of its transmitter site to Thurston Point. Bowman lasted a month in the position before resigning, citing disagreements with station management. In June 1968, KONA altered its format to "all Hawaiian" with the exception of Japanese and Filipino newscasts.

Mauna Loa, however, ran into financial difficulties, and KONA went off the air for good on August 1, 1968. The station's property—but not its license—was put up for auction, with the winning bid of $85,000 being placed by Pacific Broadcasting, owners of KUAM on Guam. The Pacific bid, however, was contingent on the company obtaining the license; that did not occur and the auction was voided by a circuit court judge.

Its license was deleted on May 23, 1969.

=== KKON ===
Instead, Richard and Thomas Jones of Detroit, owners of that city's WQTE, were issued a Construction Permit by the FCC on August 13, 1969 to build a replacement station. After originally stating they might not bid on KONA's "obsolete" facilities, they did so anyway, placing the lone bid for $37,101. Under the new Kona Koast Broadcasting Company ownership, the station was issued the call letters KKON on September 16, 1969, and made its debut broadcast twelve days later. (The KONA call sign was assigned to a station in Washington state on October 20, 1969.) KKON featured former KONA staff at the station manager and chief engineer positions, as well as a former KONA announcer on its air staff; it aired a "good music" format with no rock. When the station attempted to change to a rock-and-roll/country mix on May 20, 1974—allegedly as part of a ratings survey—an avalanche of nearly 120 calls of disapproval from local listeners (compared to just four in support of the new format) prompted the station to revert the change and restore its "beautiful and enchanting" sound the next day.

A sale of KKON to Dean Manley, who owned KHLO in Hilo, was announced in June 1975 but canceled two months later.

=== Ownership turmoil in the 1980s and 1990s ===
The 1980s and early 1990s brought with them turmoil and ownership turnover. In 1984, Kona Koast sold KKON and its newly built FM counterpart, KOAS FM, to Kona Radio Systems for $785,000; Kona Radio Systems was owned by Los Angeles sportscaster Gil Stratton. Two years later, Stratton sold the stations to Kona Broadcasting Systems for $859,000; Kona Broadcasting was owned by Bill Evans, who also owned the Clio Awards. A year later, Evans acquired Hilo television station KHBC-TV. That station shut down and was then sold to Honolulu's KHNL-TV after Evans settled with the National Labor Relations Board, in part to avoid jeopardizing the license renewals of his radio stations.

Thomas Jones reappeared in KKON's history in 1991, when he filed foreclosure proceedings against Evans to buy back the radio stations that he had originally owned and seeking an additional $700,000 in punitive damages. Jones alleged Evans was several months delinquent on his payments; at the time, Evans was dealing with the disastrous 1991 Clios, where the radio awards turned into a mad dash for trophies and the television ceremony was canceled the same day because he could not cover the deposit. Acting as receiver, Jones sold KKON-KOAS in 1992 to Visionary Related Entertainment, owners of KAOI-AM-FM on Maui.

Visionary's stations in Hilo and Kona were bought by Big Island Radio in 1997. KKON thereafter served as a simulcast of other stations for most of the rest of its life; it simulcast KAOE's oldies format in the 1990s before shifting to a simulcast of the Hawaiian/standards format of KIPA in 1999.

=== ESPN Hawaii and closure ===
KHLO/KKON simulcast logo as ESPN Radio affiliates

Pacific Media Group acquired KKON in 2003 but was required to divest three stations, including the FM station (which had become KAOY). The sale united KKON with KHLO, as had originally been proposed in 1975. The two stations simulcast a sports format, affiliated with ESPN Radio. At the end of their life, the stations' local broadcast rights included athletic events of the University of Hawaiʻi at Hilo and University of Hawaiʻi at Manoa, Big Island Interscholastic Federation high school sports, St. Louis Cardinals baseball featuring Hilo native Kolten Wong, and other national sports events.

KKON and KHLO ceased operations on July 1, 2017. In filings with the Federal Communications Commission, Pacific claimed that the two stations went silent rather than repoint the satellite dish that received their programming from satellite AMC-8, which was taken out of service at midnight on June 30, 2017. AMC-8 was replaced by AMC-18, which is at a different location in the sky, requiring repointing the station's dish. According to a post by former station personality Josh Pacheco, however, the decision to shutter the two stations was purely financial.

On August 15, 2017, Pacific filed to donate KKON to the First Assembly King's Cathedral and Chapels, owners of KUAU on Maui. KKON temporarily emerged from silence from June 11–13, 2018, before going silent again, with Kings Assembly citing a non-functioning transmitter. Its license was cancelled on September 19, 2019.
