= KINE-FM =

Radio station in Honolulu

- Honolulu, Hawaii; United States
- Broadcast area: Honolulu metropolitan area
- Frequency: 105.1 MHz (HD Radio)
- Branding: Hawaiian 105 KINE

Programming
- Language: English
- Format: Hawaiian adult contemporary
- Subchannels: HD2: Traditional Hawaiian music "Onipa'a 105.1 HD2"

Ownership
- Owner: SummitMedia; (SM-KINE, LLC)
- Sister stations: KCCN-FM; KRTR-FM; KPHW

History
- First air date: November 1988
- Former call signs: KIOV (1988–1989); KHFX (1989–1992)
- Call sign meaning: "Da Kine", Hawaiian Pidgin for "the kind"

Technical information
- Licensing authority: FCC
- Facility ID: 34553
- Class: C
- ERP: 100,000 watts (horiz.); 81,000 watts (vert.)
- HAAT: 599 meters (1,965 ft)
- Transmitter coordinates: 21.394°N 158.098°W

Links
- Public license information: Public file; LMS
- Webcast: Listen live; Listen live (HD2); Listen live (via iHeartRadio)
- Website: www.hawaiian105.com

KINE-FM (105.1 MHz, "Hawaiian 105 KINE") is a commercial radio station licensed to Honolulu, Hawaii, United States. It is owned by SummitMedia and it broadcasts a Hawaiian adult contemporary radio format. The station's studios and offices are on Fort Street near Nimitz Highway in Downtown Honolulu.

KINE-FM's transmitter is sited off of Palehua Road on Palikea Ridge in Akupu. KINE-FM is also heard on Oceanic Spectrum digital channel 855 for the entire state of Hawaii.

== History ==
=== Early years ===
KINE-FM signed on the air in November 1988. It was owned by RLS Radio with studios on Bishop Street. It started with a classic hits format, which changed to classic rock by the early 1990s.

It switched to a Hawaiian adult contemporary format on January 28, 1992, to compete against Hawaiian CHR/Top 40 100.3 KCCN-FM. KINE-FM was later purchased by then KCCN-FM owner B.J. Glascock and the two became sister stations in 1993. KCCN-FM aims at younger Hawaiian listeners while KINE-FM aims a bit older. KINE was later sold a year later in 1994 to Diamond Head Radio.

KINE target 25-54 listeners of Hawaiian descent, done in an adult-appeal presentation. It plays Hawaiian songs from the 1970s, 1980s and 1990s. This direction distinguishes KINE-FM from co-owned KCCN-FM, which plays more youthful Top 40/CHR-style Hawaiian music. For many years, KINE-FM was co-owned with KKNE 940 AM, which aimed at 35-64 listeners and played older traditional Hawaiian hits. KKNE went silent in December 2022.

=== Changes in ownership ===
In 2000, KINE-FM was acquired by Cox Media, Inc. Cox is based in Atlanta and owns radio and television stations, cable systems and newspapers.

On July 20, 2012, Cox Radio announced the sale of KINE-FM and 22 other stations. They were being sold to Summit Media LLC for $66.25 million. The sale was consummated on May 3, 2013.
