= KGU-FM =

Radio station in Honolulu, Hawaii

- Honolulu, Hawaii; United States
- Broadcast area: Honolulu metropolitan area
- Frequency: 99.5 MHz
- Branding: 99.5 FM The Word

Programming
- Format: Christian talk and teaching
- Network: SRN News

Ownership
- Owner: Malama Media Group; (Malama Media Group, LLC)
- Sister stations: KGU, KHCM, KHCM-FM, KHNR, KKOL-FM

History
- First air date: March 1, 1993
- Call sign meaning: KORL (1993–2002); KHUI (2002–2010)

Technical information
- Licensing authority: FCC
- Facility ID: 641
- Class: C
- ERP: 100,000 watts horizontal polarization 81,000 watts vertical polarization
- HAAT: 599 meters (1,965 ft)
- Transmitter coordinates: 21°23′51″N 158°6′1″W

Links
- Public license information: Public file; LMS
- Webcast: Listen Live
- Website: 995kgufm.com

KGU-FM (99.5 FM) is a commercial radio station in Honolulu, Hawaii, broadcasting a Christian talk and teaching radio format. It is owned by the Malama Media Group with studios and offices on North King Street in Honolulu's Kalihi district. KGU-FM is a brokered programming station where hosts pay for their time on the air and may use their shows to seek donations to their ministries. National religious leaders heard on KGU-FM include David Jeremiah, Jim Daly, Charles Stanley, J. Vernon McGee and Chuck Swindoll. Several Honolulu pastors also have shows on the station.

KGU-FM has an effective radiated power of 100,000 watts horizontal polarization and 81,000 watts vertical. Its transmitter is off Palehua Road in Akupu, Hawaii.

== History ==
=== Japanese tourism and Hawaiian AC ===
The station signed on the air on March 1, 1993. The original call sign was KORL. It had a Japanese tourist information format. In 1999, the station switched to Hawaiian Adult Contemporary music. In 2002, it added the moniker "The Breeze" and changed call letters to KHUI.

In 2003, KHUI became the first station in the United States to play a Variety Hits format when it brought Bob FM to the Honolulu radio market. But the format didn't score well in the Arbitron ratings and only lasted a year.

=== Salem ownership ===
In 2004, the Salem Media Group bought the station and reinstated "The Breeze" Hawaiian AC format that same year. In November 2006, KHUI switched formats to soft oldies and adult standards, branded as "The Jewel." It used the satellite-fed service "America's Best Music" from Dial Global (now Westwood One). America's Best Music was previously heard in the market from 1995 to 2001 on KUMU 1500 AM.

On December 26, 2010, KHUI flipped from Adult Standards to a simulcast of Salem's Christian Talk sister station KGU 760 AM. The call letters switched to KGU-FM to match the call sign on 760 AM.

The simulcast ended on February 1, 2011, when the AM station flipped to Business Talk. That left KGU-FM with the Christian talk and teaching format. (KGU 760 is now a sports radio station.)

Salem Media Group, Inc. announced on March 17, 2025, the sale of their remaining radio stations and digital assets in Honolulu, Hawaii to Malama Media Group. Malama intends to keep all radio stations in their present formats.

== See also ==
- List of three-letter broadcast call signs in the United States
