= KPHW =

Rhythmic contemporary radio station in Kaneohe, Hawaii

Coordinates: 21.327°N 157.754°W

- Kaneohe, Hawaii; United States
- Broadcast area: Honolulu metropolitan area
- Frequency: 104.3 MHz
- Branding: Power 104.3

Programming
- Format: Rhythmic contemporary

Ownership
- Owner: SummitMedia; (SM-KPHW, LLC)
- Sister stations: KCCN-FM; KINE-FM; KRTR-FM

History
- First air date: October 19, 1997
- Former call signs: KXME (1997–2004)
- Call sign meaning: Power Hawaii

Technical information
- Licensing authority: FCC
- Facility ID: 27424
- Class: C
- ERP: 75,000 watts
- HAAT: 645 meters (2,116 ft)

Links
- Public license information: Public file; LMS
- Webcast: Listen live
- Website: power1043.com

KPHW (104.3 FM) is a commercial radio station licensed to Kaneohe, Hawaii, United States, and serves the Honolulu metropolitan area. Owned by SummitMedia, it airs a rhythmic contemporary format as "Power 104.3" and also transmits on Oceanic Spectrum digital channel 858 for the entire state of Hawaii. The station's studios are located in Downtown Honolulu and its transmitter is located east of Diamond Head.

== History ==
The station hit the airwaves on October 19, 1997, as KXME, "Xtreme Radio @ 104.3" until 2001, and "104-3 XME Hawaii's No. 1 Hit Music Station" from 2001 to 2004, and offered a mainstream top 40 direction that focused on hip hop and modern rock hits. During the early years of the station, it tended to play very unusual music on the station, including one of the first instances of playing a heavily edited version of the Insane Clown Posse's Boogeyman. It proved to be a success at first, but by 1998, it would wear out its welcome, resulting in the station dropping the modern rock tracks and shifting to a rhythmic top 40 direction. As of 2016, the station was one of five rhythmic top 40 outlets in Hawaii, and one of three rhythmic top 40 outlets in the Honolulu market, the competitions being KUBT "93.9 The Beat" and KDDB "102.7 Da Bomb". In 2018, the station shifted back to a more mainstream top 40 direction with less focus on rhythmic top 40.

In 2022, the station returned to a rhythmic top 40 direction due to sister station KRTR-FM shifting towards a hot adult contemporary format with mainstream top 40 elements, leaving KDDB as the only mainstream top 40 station in Honolulu.

== Programming ==
In 2004, it changed its call letters to KPHW and adopted the "Power 104.3" handle to reflect its current position and focus on R&B/hip-hop product, but by 2010, it began moving more towards rhythmic pop tracks, which became more noticeable after the recent departures of top 40/CHR rival KQMQ and longtime Rhythmic rival KIKI, the latter returning as KHJZ. Like both KHJZ and KDDB, KPHW's playlist favors more hit-driven product while retaining the hip-hop elements. Notable on-air personalities include "KC and Taka" in the morning, "Island Boy" in the afternoons, and Micah Banks in the evenings. In September 2016, KPHW dropped "Hits & Hip-Hop" as its slogan in favor of "Hawaii's Hit Music Channel" in the wake of former competitor KHJZ's return to rhythmic and contemporary hits and their similar slogan "93.9 The Beat, Hawaii's #1 Hit Music Station". As of 2018, the station has returned to a top-40 CHR format with less focus on rhythmic hits. Ironically, KDDB also followed suit with their transition to top 40/CHR at the same time, giving Honolulu two outlets with top 40/CHRs, ending a five-year drought in Honolulu and return to having two mainstream CHRs for the first time since 1997.

On July 20, 2012, Cox Radio, Inc. announced the sale of KPHW and 22 other stations to Summit Media LLC for $66.25 million. The sale was consummated on May 3, 2013.
