= KKOL-FM =

- Aiea, Hawaii; United States
- Broadcast area: Honolulu, Hawaii
- Frequency: 107.9 MHz
- Branding: Kool 107.9

Programming
- Format: Classic hits

Ownership
- Owner: Malama Media Group; (Malama Media Group, LLC)
- Sister stations: KGU; KGU-FM; KHCM; KHCM-FM; KHNR

History
- First air date: August 27, 1992
- Former call signs: KTSS (1989–1992); KGUY (1992–1993); KGMZ (1993–1998); KGMZ-FM (1998–2008)
- Call sign meaning: "Kool Gold" (former branding)

Technical information
- Licensing authority: FCC
- Facility ID: 70384
- Class: C
- ERP: 100,000 watts
- HAAT: 599 meters (1,965 ft)
- Transmitter coordinates: 21°23′51″N 158°6′1″W

Links
- Public license information: Public file; LMS
- Webcast: Listen live
- Website: kool1079hawaii.com

KKOL-FM (107.9 MHz, "Kool 107.9") is a commercial FM radio station serving the Honolulu, Hawaii media market. The Malama Media Group outlet broadcasts at 107.9 MHz with an ERP of 100 kW and is licensed to Aiea, Hawaii. Its transmitter is on Palehua Road in Kapolei and its studios and offices are in Honolulu.

KKOL-FM airs a locally programmed Classic Hits format, which mostly utilizes a tightly programmed playlist consisting of hits from the 1970s, 80s and 90s. A couple songs by the Hawaiian duo Cecilio & Kapono are also in regular rotation to give the station a more local feel.

== History ==
KGMZ signed on the air on August 27, 1992, as a Top 40 station, only to flip formats to smooth jazz in 1994. That would give way to an oldies format, known as Hawaii's Oldies 107.9 in 1997.

The station was assigned the KKOL-FM call letters by the Federal Communications Commission on December 26, 2008. The station would consequently become known as Kool Gold 107.9, to go along with the syndicated satellite program of the same name from Dial Global that they began airing. Westwood One eventually bought out Dial Global, and the program simply became known as 'Classic Hits Total.'

The station later dropped affiliation with Westwood One, and on January 1, 2021, rebranded as "Kool 107.9"

Until his death in 2016, longtime Hawaiian radio personality and concert promoter "Uncle" Tom Moffatt hosted a Saturday morning program for many years.

Salem Media Group, Inc. announced on March 17, 2025, the sale of their remaining radio stations and digital assets in Honolulu, Hawaii to Malama Media Group. Malama intends to keep all radio stations in their present formats.

On September 3, 2026, KKOL-FM rebranded as "Kool 107.9". The station held a 1.6 share in the July 2026 Eastlan ratings, below rivaling KORL-FM's 1.7.
