= KUAU =

- Haiku, Hawaii; United States
- Frequency: 1570 kHz

Programming
- Format: Religious talk

Ownership
- Owner: First Assembly King's Cathedral and Chapels
- Sister stations: KLUI-LP; KIOM-LP

Technical information
- Facility ID: 36687
- Class: B
- Power: 15,000 watts fulltime
- Transmitter coordinates: 20°47′30″N 156°28′1″W

KUAU (1570 AM) was a radio station licensed to serve Haiku, Hawaii. The station was owned by First Assembly King's Cathedral and Chapels. It aired a religious talk radio format.

The station was assigned the KUAU call letters by the Federal Communications Commission on June 28, 1991. The Federal Communications Commission cancelled the station’s license on March 26, 2025.
