= KHCM-FM =

Coordinates: 21.290°N 157.839°W

- Honolulu, Hawaii; United States
- Broadcast area: Honolulu, Hawaii
- Frequency: 97.5 MHz
- Branding: 975 KHCM

Programming
- Format: Country

Ownership
- Owner: Malama Media Group; (Malama Media Group, LLC.)
- Sister stations: KAIM-FM, KKOL-FM, KGU, KGU-FM, KHCM, KHNR

History
- First air date: March 4, 1963
- Former call signs: KPOI-FM (1963–1974); KHSS (1974–1979); KDUK (1979–1983); KPOI (1983–2004); KHNR-FM (2004–2007)
- Call sign meaning: Hawaii's Country Music

Technical information
- Licensing authority: FCC
- Facility ID: 34620
- Class: C1
- ERP: 80,000 watts
- HAAT: 14 meters (46 ft)

Links
- Public license information: Public file; LMS
- Webcast: Listen Live
- Website: 975khcm.com

KHCM-FM (97.5 MHz) is a commercial radio station in Honolulu, Hawaii. It is owned by the Malama Media Group and airs a country music radio format. The studios and offices are in Honolulu's Kalihi district. KHCM-FM carries Bob Kingsley's Country Top 40 on Saturdays.

KHCM-FM has an effective radiated power (ERP) of 80,000 watts. The transmitter is in the Ala Moana neighborhood atop the Ala Moana Hotel, on Atkinson Drive.

== History ==
KPOI-FM went on the air on March 4, 1963, as the 2nd FM station in Honolulu, and the 3rd in the state, a companion to KPOI 1380 AM (today KLHT at 1040).

In 1974, KPOI-FM became KHSS. It changed its call sign to KDUK in 1979. By 1983 the station flipped formats to active rock and returned to the KPOI call letters, in honor of the former Top 40 AM sister station. In 1993 KPOI evolved to Modern rock as "97.5 The Edge." It changed its moniker back to 97-5 K-POI with the positioning slogan:"The Rock You Live On." In 2004 Salem bought the station and dropped the format, giving Hawaii its first FM Talk radio station. Sister station KAIM became its simulcast after the switch was made.

KHCM's country origins began in 2002 at 940 AM, which had once been home of the market's original country AM, KDEO. In 2005 KHCM switched signals to 1180. In 2006 Salem and KORL's owners swapped signals, and in the process moved the KHCM calls and country format over to the 690 frequency from the 1180 frequency, which in turn became the new home for KORL. On Sept. 3, 2007, KHCM switched from 690 AM to both 870 AM to 97.5 FM, keeping its country music format. The former talk format and KHNR call letters moved to 690 AM.

On July 1, 2009, Salem split up the KHCM simulcast, with the AM flipping to a Chinese-language format. The FM side retained the country format. In June 2015, KHCM-FM changed positioning statements to "Hawaii's New Hit Country".

In August 2026, KHCM-FM dropped Westwood One programming in favor of local programming. The station held a 2.2 share in the July 2026 Eastlan ratings.
