= KCCN-FM =

Hawaiian contemporary hit radio station in Honolulu

- Honolulu, Hawaii; United States
- Broadcast area: Oahu
- Frequency: 100.3 MHz (HD Radio)
- Branding: KCCN FM100

Programming
- Language: English
- Format: Hawaiian contemporary hit radio
- Subchannels: HD2: Spanish CHR "Mega 104.7" Hawaii's Latin Hits

Ownership
- Owner: SummitMedia; (SM-KCCN, LLC)
- Sister stations: KINE-FM; KRTR-FM; KPHW

History
- First air date: May 21, 1990
- Call sign meaning: Carle, Cloward and Neville, founders of former AM sister

Technical information
- Licensing authority: FCC
- Facility ID: 34552
- Class: C
- ERP: 100,000 watts (horizontal); 81,000 watts (vertical)
- HAAT: 599 meters (1,965 ft)
- Transmitter coordinates: 21.394°N 158.098°W
- Translators: 104.7 K284AL (Honolulu, relays HD2)

Links
- Public license information: Public file; LMS
- Webcast: Listen live; Listen live (via iHeartRadio)
- Website: www.kccnfm100.com

KCCN-FM (100.3 MHz, "KCCN FM100") is a commercial Hawaiian contemporary hit radio station. The SummitMedia outlet broadcasts with ERP of 100 kW. The station's studios are located in Downtown Honolulu and its transmitter is located near Akupu. It also transmits on Oceanic Spectrum digital channel 852 for the entire state of Hawaii.

== History ==
KCCN FM100, whose first broadcast day was May 21, 1990, under general manager Michael Kelly, Program Director Honolulu Skylark and Music Director William Van Osdol (Billy V). It was the sister station to the original KCCN 1420 AM, whose focus would always be on a traditional Hawaiian music format. They are also Honolulu's first FM station in this genre to target young adults of Hawaiian/Pacific Islander descent with a hit format that consists of upbeat contemporary Hawaiian music from Hawaiian acts like Kapena, The Mana'o Company, Bruddah Waltah & Island Afternoon, and Butch Helemano; along with tracks from other unique national genres, like reggae, dancehall and contemporary artists whose music fit those descriptions, like UB40, Bob Marley, Maxi Priest, Big Mountain, Magic! and others. With those ingredients, KCCN has become one of Honolulu's top-rated radio stations.

== Concerts and events ==
KCCN FM100, in its first year, put together an annual concert that would celebrate the birthday of the station, and would eventually become a standard in concerts for every summer. It was always scheduled for the last Saturday in July at the Waikiki Shell, and would highlight the best bands in Contemporary Hawaiian music, with special guests from either contemporary Top 40 radio or traditional Hawaiian music, with emphasis on the latter. It came to be known as the KCCN FM 100 Birthday Bash.

The KCCN FM100 Birthday Bash in 2000, went to a two-night event, being the last Friday and Saturday in the month of July. It has sold out almost every year in its existence since 1990, and continues to be an annual staple for the station. 2012, was the Last Birthday Bash event at the Waikiki Shell.

== Ownership ==
In the mid 1990s, KCCN-FM would be joined by Hawaiian 105 KINE, broadcasting out of the 4th floor of the Pioneer Plaza Building in downtown Honolulu. After the two were paired up KINE shifted to a Traditional Hawaiian format targeting 25-54s, which was KCCN (AM)'s former format. In 1999, Cox Radio bought the stations from Howard Anderson (Los Angeles, California) and combined the assets that they already had to become Cox Radio Hawai'i, pairing it with KRTR 96 FM, KPHW (Power 104.3) and later stations KORL 1460 AM and KKNE 940 AM. They would all later move together to occupy the 7th floor of the Pioneer Plaza Building.

On July 20, 2012, Cox Radio, Inc. announced the sale of KCCN-FM and 22 other stations to Summit Media LLC for $66.25 million. The sale was consummated on May 3, 2013.
