= KHCM (AM) =

Chinese-language radio station in Honolulu, Hawaii

- Honolulu, Hawaii; United States
- Broadcast area: Honolulu metropolitan area
- Frequency: 880 kHz
- Branding: China Radio International

Programming
- Format: Chinese

Ownership
- Owner: Malama Media Group, LLC
- Sister stations: KKOL-FM, KGU, KHCM-FM, KGU-FM, KHNR

History
- First air date: August 31, 1956
- Former call signs: KAIM (1956–2002)
- Call sign meaning: Hawaii's Country Music (Former format)

Technical information
- Licensing authority: FCC
- Facility ID: 10934
- Class: B
- Power: 2,000 watts
- Transmitter coordinates: 21°17′29.7″N 157°51′39″W

Links
- Public license information: Public file; LMS

KHCM (880 AM) is a Chinese-language radio station licensed to Honolulu, Hawaii. It is owned by the Malama Media Group with offices and studios on North King Street in Honolulu's Kalihi district.

KHCM transmits with 2,000 watts, using a non-directional antenna. The transmitter is on Ahui Street on Mamala Bay in the Kakaako neighborhood.

== History ==
The station signed on the air on August 31, 1956. The original call sign was KAIM, broadcasting on 870 kilocycles with 5,000 watts. It was owned by the Christian Broadcasting Association and had a Christian radio format.

Salem Media bought KAIM in 2000, and wanted to take the station off the air. That would allow its sister station in Los Angeles, KRLA 870 AM, to increase its nighttime power. At the last minute, Salem management decided to reduce KHCM's power, shift its frequency to 880 kHz and let the Honolulu station continue broadcasting.

In 2004, Salem bought modern rock outlet 97.5 KPOI (FM) and flipped it to a talk radio format, the first FM talk station in Hawaii. KAIM 880 became its simulcast after the switch was made. On September 3, 2007, country music outlet KHCM, also owned by Salem Media, switched from 690 AM to both 880 AM to 97.5 FM, keeping its format intact. Salem, in turn, moved the talk radio format and the call sign KHNR to 690 AM.

On July 1, 2009, after nearly 3 years of simulcasting, KHCM 880 split from KHCM-FM 97.5. The AM station adopted a Chinese-language format, calling itself "Radio China International". The format targets Honolulu's growing Chinese-American population in both Mandarin Chinese and English. In addition to the Chinese programming, KHCM also broadcasts some Japanese-language and Korean-language shows.

The Salem Media Group announced on March 17, 2025, the sale of the company's remaining radio stations and digital assets in Honolulu. The stations, including KHCM, would be sold to Malama Media Group for $2 million. Malama said it would keep the formats on the stations as they were under Salem ownership.
