= KHLO =

Radio station in Hilo, Hawaii

- Hilo, Hawaii; United States
- Frequency: 850 kHz

Ownership
- Owner: First Assembly King's Cathedral and Chapels

History
- First air date: March 28, 1951
- Former call signs: KILA (1951–1959); KIMO (1959–1969)
- Call sign meaning: Hilo

Technical information
- Licensing authority: FCC
- Facility ID: 37210
- Class: B
- Power: 5,000 watts (unlimited)
- Transmitter coordinates: 19°41′36.8″N 155°2′55.2″W

Links
- Public license information: Public file; LMS

KHLO (850 AM) is a radio station licensed to Hilo, Hawaii, United States. The station serves the Hilo area. The station is currently owned by First Assembly King's Cathedral and Chapels.

== History ==
=== KILA and KIMO ===
On March 6, 1950, the Island Broadcasting Company—formed by John D. Keating and J. Elroy McCaw—received the construction permit to start a new radio station on 850 kHz in Hilo, to broadcast with 1,000 watts. Initially designated KOLU, the call letters changed to KILA before launch. Studios were built in Hilo's Grand Naniloa Hotel where a sun deck formerly had been located. KILA began broadcasting on March 28, 1951; affiliated with Honolulu's KPOA and the Mutual Broadcasting System, it was the third station on air in the town. Less than a year after opening, the section of the hotel that housed the station burned to the ground, sparing only the transmitter tower. What could have been six months of silence was cut down by good luck. The preceding week, Windward Oahu Broadcasting Company, which was applying for a station in Kaneohe, had shipped to the territory a 1,000-watt transmitter, which was loaned to KILA to allow it to resume its own broadcasts; the hotel relocated KILA to one of the cottages on the grounds.

Keating and McCaw sold KILA to James E. "Jim" Jaeger, the general manager, in 1954. The transaction was a matter of necessity, as the Federal Communications Commission had ordered J. Elroy McCaw to sell stations to come into compliance with ownership limits. Five years later, the call letters changed from KILA to KIMO: in explaining the choice to the FCC, Jaeger noted, "In Hawaiian it means Jim, same as your name and mine". The KIMO facilities at the Naniloa also helped bring Hilo ABC television when KHJK channel 13 went on the air from the site in 1960, with Jaeger serving as operations manager.

After 13 years of management and later ownership of the station, Jaeger sold KIMO in 1964 to Hugh V. Garrabrant, who owned a car dealership in Hood River, Oregon. Garrabrant continued with much the same programming that had been broadcast, while Jaeger moved to run a station in Honolulu. Garrabrant moved the station in 1966 from the Naniloa to studios in the new Nalei Hotel and a transmitter in Keaukaha. In its new home, the station yet again took damage within months of moving in, this time water damage from high surf that caused four inches of sea water, mud, shells and seaweed to cover the floors.

=== KHLO ===
Another group of buyers from the Mainland purchased KIMO in 1969. Kerby Scott Productions of Maryland acquired the station and made major changes in personnel, format and—for the last time—call letters. On June 2, KIMO was replaced by KHLO, airing a contemporary music format and bringing an infusion of new managers and announcers, mostly from the Mainland. Four years later, another Mainland group—the Escanaba Broadcasting Company of Michigan—bought the station from Kerby Scott. Aside from a morning block of country music, the general format remained unchanged, but the station now had network affiliations with CBS and NBC.

A high-profile legal case brought an end to Escanaba Broadcasting's ownership of KHLO. In 1975, the owner of a chain of retail stores in Hilo sued KHLO and morning personality Walter Pacheco for $2 million. William De La Mare claimed that Pacheco had called him a "no good haole" (a foreigner) who "no like [sic] local people or people who speak pidgen", advised his listeners not to shop at the store, and suggested that "he'd better leave Hawaii". In the week that followed the broadcast, his family received threats; his employees were intimidated; and his store was burglarized. Before De La Mare was awarded $240,000 by a circuit court jury, Escanaba Broadcasting was placed into receivership in late 1976.

Mid-Pacific Broadcasting Company, owned by the Linch family of Nebraska, purchased KHLO from the receiver in 1977 for $175,000.

After a year on the market and lengthy negotiations, Linch sold KHLO to Brewer Broadcasting Company, owner of KKBG (97.9 FM), in 1989. By the 1990s, KHLO was airing an oldies format. In 1997, the original 1951 transmitter tower collapsed in a wind storm; the station was silent for nearly 10 months.

In 1998, Brewer sold its four Big Island radio properties to Emerald City Radio Partners for $3.8 million. Emerald City became Maverick Media, and its stations were sold to Pacific Radio Group; its simultaneous purchases of two clusters caused major radio station ownership realignment on the Big Island.

=== ESPN Hawaii ===
Pacific Radio Group united KHLO with its AM station for the western part of the Big Island, KKON (790 AM). The pairing had first been proposed in 1975, when Dean Manley, one of the owners of Escanaba Broadcasting, announced he would buy the Kealakekua-licensed station, but the deal was canceled two years after its announcement. The two stations became a simulcast known as ESPN Hawaii, airing a sports format and affiliated with ESPN Radio. At the end of their life, the stations' local broadcast rights included athletic events of the University of Hawaiʻi at Hilo and University of Hawaiʻi at Manoa, Big Island Interscholastic Federation high school sports, St. Louis Cardinals baseball featuring Hilo native Kolten Wong, and other national sports events.

KKON and KHLO ceased operations on July 1, 2017. In filings with the Federal Communications Commission, Pacific claimed that the two stations went silent rather than repoint the satellite dish that received their programming from satellite AMC-8, which was taken out of service at midnight on June 30, 2017. AMC-8 was replaced by AMC-18, which is at a different location in the sky, requiring repointing the station's dish. According to a post by former station personality Josh Pacheco, however, the decision to shutter the two stations was purely financial.

=== King's Cathedral ===
On August 15, 2017, Pacific filed to donate KHLO and KKON to First Assembly King's Cathedral and Chapels, which also owns KUAU on Maui; the West Hawaii station never returned, but KHLO did, resuming broadcasts on August 8, 2019.
