= KGU (AM) =

- Honolulu, Hawaii; United States
- Broadcast area: Honolulu metropolitan area
- Frequency: 760 kHz
- Branding: Hawaii Sports Radio Network 95.1 FM & AM 760

Programming
- Format: Sports
- Affiliations: VSiN Radio

Ownership
- Owner: Malama Media Group; (Malama Media Group, LLC)
- Sister stations: KKOL-FM, KGU-FM, KHCM, KHCM-FM, KHNR

History
- First air date: June 2, 1922

Technical information
- Licensing authority: FCC
- Facility ID: 53705
- Class: B
- Power: 10,000 watts unlimited
- Transmitter coordinates: 21°17′29.7″N 157°51′39″W
- Translator: 95.1 K236CR (Honolulu)

Links
- Public license information: Public file; LMS
- Webcast: Listen Live
- Website: hawaiisportsradio.com

KGU (760 kHz) is a commercial AM radio station in Honolulu, Hawaii, known as "Hawaii Sports Radio Network". It is owned by the Malama Media Group and broadcasts a sports radio format, carrying syndicated programming from the VSiN Radio. The radio studios and offices are in Honolulu's Kalihi district, and its transmitter is in the Kakaako neighborhood.

AM 760 is a United States clear-channel frequency, on which WJR in Detroit is the dominant Class A station. There are only 18 stations on 760 AM within the United States. KGU is far enough away from Detroit that it broadcasts day and night with 10,000 watts, using a non-directional antenna. Programming is also heard on 250-watt FM translator K236CR at 95.1 MHz.

== History ==
KGU is Hawaii's oldest radio station, founded decades before Hawaii became a state. It signed on the air on June 2, 1922. By the 1930s, KGU was transmitting with 2,500 watts on 750 kilocycles. It was owned by the Advertiser Publishing Company, owners of The Honolulu Advertiser, carrying programs from the NBC Red Network. With the enactment of the North American Regional Broadcasting Agreement (NARBA), KGU moved one spot up the dial to 760 kHz.

In April 1935 it was used as a homing beacon by Captain Ed Musick and Fred Noonan during their survey flights of the Pacific in a Pan American World Airways Sikorsky S-42. In 1941, Japanese aviators used the station's signal to achieve radio silence and lead them to their attack on Pearl Harbor; later that day, a KGU reporter broadcast news of the attack nationwide on NBC, a report that was interrupted by a telephone operator.

As network program moved from radio to television in the 1950s, KGU switched to a full service, middle of the road format of popular music, news and sports. In the early 2000s, the station began playing adult standards.

On December 24, 2010, KGU began simulcasting country music along with sister station 99.5 KHUI, after dropping the Adult Standards format. The FM station took the call sign KGU-FM to match the AM sister. However, after simulcasting for over a month, KGU changed to a Business Talk format on February 1, 2011. The station features programming from the Wall Street Radio Network and CNBC.

In December 2018, the station adopted a Classic Country format branded as "95.1 and AM 760 Honolulu's Real Country".

In April 2021, KGU changed its format from country to all-sports, branded as "Hawaii Sports Radio Network". It uses programming from the SportsMap Radio Network, based in Houston.

In 2022, KGU became an affiliate of the Motor Racing Network, carrying selected NASCAR Cup Series races.

"Hawaii Sports Radio Network" carries live play-by-play broadcasts of O'ahu Interscholastic Association (OIA) sports and local NCAA DII colleges (Hawai'i Pacific University, Chaminade University of Honolulu, University of Hawai'i-Hilo).

Other national affiliations include the Dallas Cowboys, USC Trojans, Seattle Mariners, Los Angeles Clippers.

== FM translator ==
KGU also broadcasts its programming on an FM translator.

Broadcast translator for KGU (AM)
Call sign	Frequency	City of license	FID	ERP (W)	Class	FCC info
K236CR	95.1 FM	Honolulu, Hawaii	142637	250	D	LMS

== See also ==
- 1922 in radio
- List of radio stations in Hawaii
- List of initial AM-band station grants in the United States
- List of three-letter broadcast call signs in the United States
