= KKNE =

Coordinates: 21°26′43″N 158°03′49″W

- Waipahu, Hawaii; United States
- Broadcast area: Honolulu, Hawaii
- Frequency: 940 kHz
- Branding: The Vine Connection

Programming
- Format: Urban Gospel

Ownership
- Owner: Raleigh-Wake Chapter of the National Alumni Association of Shaw University
- Sister stations: KPRP

History
- First air date: September 20, 1950
- Former call signs: KAHU (1950–1980); KDEO (1980–1994); KJPN (1994–2002); KHCM (2002–2005); KJPN (2005)

Technical information
- Licensing authority: FCC
- Facility ID: 14937
- Class: B
- Power: 10,000 watts unlimited

Links
- Public license information: Public file; LMS

KKNE (940 AM) is a radio station licensed to Waipahu, Hawaii and located in the Honolulu, Hawaii radio market, broadcasting with a power of 10,000 watts. The station's format was last a hybrid of traditional Hawaiian music and talk/information geared toward adults of Native Hawaiian descent. The station is owned by Raleigh-Wake Chapter of the National Alumni Association of Shaw University. The station's studios are located in Downtown Honolulu and its transmitter was located near Kunia Camp. It was also featured on Oceanic Spectrum digital channel 856 for the entire state of Hawaii. It was originally on 920 kHz and moved to 940 kHz in 1962.

A unique feature of KKNE was a greeting and current time given in Hawaiian and English along with the station identification at the top and bottom of each hour (at :00 and :30 past the hour), with a steel guitar playing as background music.

== History ==
Prior to its flip to Traditional Hawaiian, KKNE was home to longtime country music outlet KDEO and later Japanese music-formatted KJPN.

Former logo

The license was surrendered to the Federal Communications Commission on December 5, 2022, who cancelled it the same day. It was reinstated on December 8, 2022 but remained silent, and its license was formally surrendered and deleted again on May 11, 2023. Its license was reinstated again, and still remains silent.

On November 27, 2023, KKNE and KPRP returned to the airwaves as Urban Gospel The Vine Connection, programmed by Mae Rodgers, who had previously offered this format and branding on WTOW, WSTK, WEGG, and KCTO. Mae Rodgers is an AME Zion pastor from North Carolina who is a Gospel Radio veteran. This marks the first time that the Urban Gospel has existed on radio in the state of Hawaii.
