= KRTR-FM =

Radio station in Honolulu, Hawaii

- Kailua, Hawaii; United States
- Broadcast area: Honolulu, Hawaii
- Frequency: 96.3 MHz
- Branding: Krater 96

Programming
- Format: Hot adult contemporary

Ownership
- Owner: SummitMedia; (SM-KRTR-FM, LLC)
- Sister stations: KCCN-FM, KINE-FM, KPHW

History
- First air date: 1978
- Former call signs: KSHO (1978–1984)
- Call sign meaning: "Krater" (reference to Diamond Head, whose location is shaped like a crater)

Technical information
- Licensing authority: FCC
- Facility ID: 50118
- Class: C
- ERP: 75,000 watts
- HAAT: 645 meters
- Transmitter coordinates: 21°19′37.5″N 157°45′14.1″W
- Translator: 105.7 K289BE (Kawaihae)

Links
- Public license information: Public file; LMS
- Webcast: Listen live
- Website: www.krater963.com

KRTR-FM (96.3 MHz, "Krater 96") is a hot adult contemporary music formatted radio station serving Honolulu, Hawaii. The SummitMedia outlet broadcasts with an ERP of 74 kW and is licensed to Kailua, Hawaii. The station's studios are located in Downtown Honolulu and its transmitter is located east of Diamond Head, Hawaii.

== History ==
KRTR signed on as KSHO on October 31, 1978, as a soft jazz outlet with the call letters KSHO. Its sister station at the time was Jazz powerhouse KKGO FM Los Angeles. Every year the stations would broadcast live from the Monterey jazz festival. In 1984 KSHO changed to KRTR and the station format changed from smooth jazz to adult contemporary using a "Drake Chenault" directed music format. By 2003 they would evolve to an Adult Top 40 direction after Cox acquired the station. By 2010 it returned to a Mainstream AC direction.

Radio personalities that worked on-air at this station through the years include John Bates, Dan Cooke, Tom Ewing, Rob Haas, Kamasami Kong, Mahlon Moore, Jane Pascual, Michael Qseng, Don Sullivan, Austin Vali, Brock Whaley, Karen Waygood and many more.

On July 20, 2012, Cox Radio, Inc. announced the sale of KRTR-FM and 22 other stations to SummitMedia for $66.25 million. The sale was consummated on May 3, 2013.

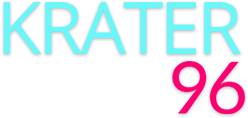
Previous logo

Since 2022, the station began to transition into a hot adult contemporary format, broadcasting under the slogan "Hawaii's Best Mix of 2K and Today". By the next year, the slogan was changed to "Hawaii's Best Variety of Hits".
