= List of television stations in the United States by call sign (initial letter K) =

This is a list of full-service television stations in the United States having call signs beginning with the letter K. Stations licensed to transmit under low-power specifications—ex., KFXF-CD, K22JA-D and KXJB-LD—have not been included. This also pertains to low-power licenses transmitting over the spectrum of a full-power license. (KAZA-TV transmits over low-power KHTV-CD's spectrum, but is included as it is classified as a full-power license.)

See also the list of TV stations beginning with W and the list of TV stations beginning with C.

Station	City of license	Channel	Network(s)
KAAH-TV	Honolulu, Hawaii	26	TBN
KAAL	Austin, Minnesota	6	ABC
KAAS-TV	Salina, Kansas	17	Fox
KABB	San Antonio, Texas	29	Fox
KABC-TV	Los Angeles, California	7	ABC
KACV-TV	Amarillo, Texas	2	PBS
KADN-TV	Lafayette, Louisiana	15	Fox
KAEF-TV	Arcata, California	23	ABC
KAET	Phoenix, Arizona	8	PBS
KAFT	Fayetteville, Arkansas	13	PBS
KAID	Boise, Idaho	4	PBS
KAII-TV	Wailuku, Hawaii	7	Fox
KAIL	Fresno, California	7	TCT
KAIT	Jonesboro, Arkansas	27	ABC
KAJB	Calipatria, California	54	UniMás
KAKE	Wichita, Kansas	10	ABC
KAKM	Anchorage, Alaska	7	PBS
KAKW-DT	Killeen, Texas	62	Univision
KALB-TV	Alexandria, Louisiana	5	NBC
KALO	Honolulu, Hawaii	38	Religious
KAMC	Lubbock, Texas	28	ABC
KAMR-TV	Amarillo, Texas	4	NBC
KAMU-TV	College Station, Texas	15	PBS
KAPP	Yakima, Washington	35	ABC
KARD	West Monroe, Louisiana	14	Fox
KARE	Minneapolis, Minnesota	11	NBC
KARK-TV	Little Rock, Arkansas	4	NBC
KARZ-TV	Little Rock, Arkansas	42	MyNetworkTV
KASA-TV	Santa Fe, New Mexico	2	Telemundo
KASN	Pine Bluff, Arkansas	38	The CW
KASW	Phoenix, Arizona	61	Independent
KASY-TV	Albuquerque, New Mexico	50	MyNetworkTV
KATC	Lafayette, Louisiana	3	ABC
KATN	Fairbanks, Alaska	2	ABC
KATU	Portland, Oregon	2	ABC
KATV	Little Rock, Arkansas	7	ABC
KAUT-TV	Oklahoma City, Oklahoma	43	The CW
KAUU	Anchorage, Alaska	5	Antenna TV
KAUZ-TV	Wichita Falls, Texas	6	CBS
KAVU-TV	Victoria, Texas	25	ABC
KAWB	Brainerd, Minnesota	22	PBS
KAWE	Bemidji, Minnesota	9	PBS
KAYU-TV	Spokane, Washington	28	Fox
KAZA-TV	Avalon, California	54	MeTV
KAZD	Lake Dallas, Texas	55	WEST
KAZQ	Albuquerque, New Mexico	32	Religious
KAZT-TV	Prescott, Arizona	7	The CW
KBAK-TV	Bakersfield, California	29	CBS
KBCA	Alexandria, Louisiana	41	Heroes & Icons
KBCB	Bellingham, Washington	24	TCT
KBDI-TV	Broomfield, Colorado	12	PBS
KBFD-DT	Honolulu, Hawaii	32	Korean independent
KBGS-TV	Billings, Montana	16	PBS
KBHE-TV	Rapid City, South Dakota	9	PBS
KBIM-TV	Roswell, New Mexico	10	CBS
KBIN-TV	Council Bluffs, Iowa	32	PBS
KBJR-TV	Superior, Wisconsin	6	NBC
KBLN-TV	Grants Pass, Oregon	30	3ABN
KBLR	Paradise, Nevada	39	Telemundo
KBME-TV	Bismarck, North Dakota	3	PBS
KBMT	Beaumont, Texas	12	ABC
KBMY	Bismarck, North Dakota	17	ABC
KBOI-TV	Boise, Idaho	2	CBS
KBRR	Thief River Falls, Minnesota	10	Fox
KBSD-DT	Ensign, Kansas	6	CBS
KBSH-DT	Hays, Kansas	7	CBS
KBSI	Cape Girardeau, Missouri	23	Fox
KBSL-DT	Goodland, Kansas	10	CBS
KBSV	Ceres, California	23	Armenian independent
KBTC-TV	Tacoma, Washington	28	PBS
KBTV-TV	Port Arthur, Texas	4	Dabl
KBTX-TV	Bryan, Texas	3	CBS
KBVO	Llano, Texas	14	MyNetworkTV
KBVU	Eureka, California	28	Fox
KBYU-TV	Provo, Utah	11	BYU TV
KBZK	Bozeman, Montana	7	CBS
KCAL-TV	Los Angeles, California	9	Independent
KCAU-TV	Sioux City, Iowa	9	ABC
KCBA	Salinas, California	35	The CW
KCBD	Lubbock, Texas	11	NBC
KCBS-TV	Los Angeles, California	2	CBS
KCBY-TV	Coos Bay, Oregon	11	CBS
KCCI	Des Moines, Iowa	8	CBS
KCCW-TV	Walker, Minnesota	12	CBS
KCDO-TV	Sterling, Colorado	3	Independent
KCDT	Coeur d'Alene, Idaho	26	PBS
KCEB	Longview, Texas	54	Fubo Sports Network
KCEC	Boulder, Colorado	14	Univision
KCEN-TV	Temple, Texas	6	NBC
KCET	Los Angeles, California	28	PBS
KCFW-TV	Kalispell, Montana	9	NBC
KCGE-DT	Crookston, Minnesota	16	PBS
KCHF	Santa Fe, New Mexico	11	Religious
KCIT	Amarillo, Texas	14	Fox
KCKA	Centralia, Washington	15	PBS
KCLO-TV	Rapid City, South Dakota	15	CBS
KCNC-TV	Denver, Colorado	4	CBS
KCNS	San Francisco, California	38	ShopHQ
KCOP-TV	Los Angeles, California	13	MyNetworkTV
KCOS	El Paso, Texas	13	PBS
KCOY-TV	Santa Maria, California	12	Dabl
KCPQ	Tacoma, Washington	13	Fox
KCPT	Kansas City, Missouri	19	PBS
KCRA-TV	Sacramento, California	3	NBC
KCRG-TV	Cedar Rapids, Iowa	9	ABC
KCSD-TV	Sioux Falls, South Dakota	23	PBS
KCSG	Cedar City, Utah	8	MeTV
KCTS-TV	Seattle, Washington	9	PBS
KCTV	Kansas City, Missouri	5	CBS
KCVU	Paradise, California	20	Fox
KCWC-DT	Lander, Wyoming	4	PBS
KCWE	Kansas City, Missouri	29	The CW
KCWI-TV	Des Moines, Iowa	23	The CW
KCWO-TV	Big Spring, Texas	4	The CW
KCWV	Duluth, Minnesota	27	TCT
KCWX	Fredericksburg, Texas	2	MyNetworkTV
KCWY-DT	Casper, Wyoming	13	NBC
KDAF	Dallas, Texas	33	The CW
KDBC-TV	El Paso, Texas	4	CBS
KDCK	Dodge City, Kansas	21	PBS
KDCU-DT	Derby, Kansas	31	Univision
KDEN-TV	Longmont, Colorado	25	Telemundo
KDFI	Dallas, Texas	27	MyNetworkTV
KDFW	Dallas, Texas	4	Fox
KDIN-TV	Des Moines, Iowa	11	PBS
KDKA-TV	Pittsburgh, Pennsylvania	2	CBS
KDKF	Klamath Falls, Oregon	31	ABC
KDLH	Duluth, Minnesota	3	The CW
KDLO-TV	Florence, South Dakota	3	CBS
KDLT-TV	Sioux Falls, South Dakota	46	NBC
KDLV-TV	Mitchell, South Dakota	5	NBC
KDMD	Anchorage, Alaska	33	Ion Television
KDMI	Des Moines, Iowa	19	TCT
KDNL-TV	St. Louis, Missouri	30	Independent
KDOC-TV	Anaheim	56	TCT
KDOR-TV	Bartlesville, Oklahoma	17	TBN
KDRV	Medford, Oregon	12	ABC
KDSD-TV	Aberdeen, South Dakota	16	PBS
KDSE	Dickinson, North Dakota	9	PBS
KDSM-TV	Des Moines, Iowa	17	Fox
KDTN	Denton, Texas	2	Daystar
KDTP	Holbrook, Arizona	11	Daystar
KDTV-DT	San Francisco, California	14	Univision
KDTX-TV	Dallas, Texas	58	TBN
KDVR	Denver, Colorado	31	Fox
KECI-TV	Missoula, Montana	13	NBC
KECY-TV	El Centro, California	9	Fox
KEDB	Fort Bragg, California	6	Religious
KEDS	Colusa, California	16	Religious
KEDT	Corpus Christi, Texas	16	PBS
KEET	Eureka, California	13	PBS
KEKE	Hilo, Hawaii	14	Spanish independent
KELO-TV	Sioux Falls, South Dakota	11	CBS
KEMO-TV	Santa Rosa, California	50	Estrella TV
KEMV	Mountain View, Arkansas	6	PBS
KENS	San Antonio, Texas	5	CBS
KENV-DT	Elko, Nevada	10	TBD
KENW	Portales, New Mexico	3	PBS
KEPB-TV	Eugene, Oregon	28	PBS
KEPR-TV	Pasco, Washington	19	CBS
KERA-TV	Dallas, Texas	13	PBS
KERO-TV	Bakersfield, California	23	ABC
KESD-TV	Brookings, South Dakota	8	PBS
KESQ-TV	Palm Springs, California	42	The CW
KETA-TV	Oklahoma City, Oklahoma	13	PBS
KETC	St. Louis, Missouri	9	PBS
KETD	Castle Rock, Colorado	53	Estrella TV
KETG	Arkadelphia, Arkansas	9	PBS
KETH-TV	Houston, Texas	14	TBN
KETK-TV	Jacksonville, Texas	56	NBC
KETS	Little Rock, Arkansas	2	PBS
KETV	Omaha, Nebraska	7	ABC
KETZ	El Dorado, Arkansas	12	PBS
KEYC-TV	Mankato, Minnesota	12	CBS
KEYE-TV	Austin, Texas	42	CBS
KEYT-TV	Santa Barbara, California	3	ABC
KEYU	Borger, Texas	31	Telemundo
KEZI	Eugene, Oregon	9	ABC
KFBB-TV	Great Falls, Montana	5	ABC
KFCT	Fort Collins, Colorado	22	Fox
KFDA-TV	Amarillo, Texas	10	CBS
KFDM	Beaumont, Texas	6	CBS
KFDR	Jefferson City, Missouri	25	CTN HD
KFDX-TV	Wichita Falls, Texas	3	NBC
KFFV	Seattle, Washington	44	MeTV
KFFX-TV	Pendleton, Oregon	11	Fox
KFJX	Pittsburg, Kansas	14	Fox
KFMB-TV	San Diego, California	8	CBS
KFME	Fargo, North Dakota	13	PBS
KFNB	Casper, Wyoming	20	Fox
KFNE	Riverton, Wyoming	10	Fox
KFNR	Rawlins, Wyoming	11	Fox
KFOR-TV	Oklahoma City, Oklahoma	4	NBC
KFOX-TV	El Paso, Texas	14	Fox
KFPH-DT	Flagstaff, Arizona	13	UniMás
KFPX-TV	Newton, Iowa	39	Ion Television
KFQX	Grand Junction, Colorado	4	Fox
KFRE-TV	Sanger, California	59	The CW
KFSF-DT	Vallejo, California	66	UniMás
KFSM-TV	Fort Smith, Arkansas	5	CBS
KFSN-TV	Fresno, California	30	ABC
KFTA-TV	Fort Smith, Arkansas	24	Fox
KFTC	Bemidji, Minnesota	26	Fox
KFTH-DT	Alvin, Texas	67	UniMás
KFTR-DT	Ontario, California	46	UniMás
KFTS	Klamath Falls, Oregon	22	PBS
KFTU-DT	Douglas, Arizona	3	UniMás
KFTV-DT	Hanford, California	21	Univision
KFVE	Kailua Kona, Hawaii	6	Independent
KFVS-TV	Cape Girardeau, Missouri	12	CBS
KFWD	Fort Worth, Texas	52	ShopHQ
KFXA	Cedar Rapids, Iowa	28	Dabl
KFXB-TV	Dubuque, Iowa	40	CTN
KFXK-TV	Longview, Texas	51	Fox
KFXL-TV	Lincoln, Nebraska	51	Fox
KFXV	Harlingen, Texas	38	Fox
KFYR-TV	Bismarck, North Dakota	5	NBC
KGAN	Cedar Rapids, Iowa	2	CBS
KGBT-TV	Harlingen, Texas	4	Antenna TV/MyNetworkTV
KGCW	Burlington, Iowa	26	The CW
KGEB	Tulsa, Oklahoma	53	GEB Network
KGET-TV	Bakersfield, California	17	NBC
KGFE	Grand Forks, North Dakota	2	Minnesota Channel
KGIN	Grand Island, Nebraska	11	CBS
KGLA-DT	Hammond, Louisiana	42	Telemundo
KGMB	Honolulu, Hawaii	5	CBS
KGMC	Merced, California	43	Estrella TV
KGMD-TV	Hilo, Hawaii	9	MyNetworkTV
KGMV	Wailuku, Hawaii	9	MyNetworkTV
KGNS-TV	Laredo, Texas	8	NBC
KGO-TV	San Francisco, California	7	ABC
KGPE	Fresno, California	47	CBS
KGPX-TV	Spokane, Washington	34	Ion Television
KGTF	Agana, Guam	12	PBS
KGTV	San Diego, California	10	ABC
KGUN-TV	Tucson, Arizona	9	ABC
KGW	Portland, Oregon	8	NBC
KGWC-TV	Casper, Wyoming	14	CBS
KGWL-TV	Lander, Wyoming	5	CBS
KGWN-TV	Cheyenne, Wyoming	5	CBS
KGWR-TV	Rock Springs, Wyoming	13	CBS
KHAW-TV	Hilo, Hawaii	11	Fox
KHBS	Fort Smith, Arkansas	40	ABC
KHCE-TV	San Antonio, Texas	23	TBN
KHET	Honolulu, Hawaii	11	PBS
KHGI-TV	Kearney, Nebraska	13	ABC
KHII-TV	Honolulu, Hawaii	9	MyNetworkTV
KHIN	Red Oak, Iowa	36	PBS
KHME	Rapid City, South Dakota	23	MeTV
KHMT	Hardin, Montana	4	Fox/Jewelry Television
KHNE-TV	Hastings, Nebraska	29	PBS
KHNL	Honolulu, Hawaii	13	NBC
KHOG-TV	Fayetteville, Arkansas	29	ABC
KHON-TV	Honolulu, Hawaii	2	Fox
KHOU	Houston, Texas	11	CBS
KHQ-TV	Spokane, Washington	6	NBC
KHQA-TV	Hannibal, Missouri	7	CBS
KHRR	Tucson, Arizona	40	Telemundo
KHSD-TV	Lead, South Dakota	11	ABC
KHSL-TV	Chico, California	12	CBS
KHSV	Las Vegas, Nevada	21	MeTV
KHVO	Hilo, Hawaii	4	ABC
KIAH	Houston, Texas	39	The CW
KICU-TV	San Jose, California	36	Independent
KIDK	Idaho Falls, Idaho	3	Dabl
KIDY	San Angelo, Texas	6	Fox
KIEM-TV	Eureka, California	3	NBC
KIFI-TV	Idaho Falls, Idaho	8	ABC
KIFR	Visalia, California	49	Classic Arts Showcase
KIII	Corpus Christi, Texas	3	ABC
KIIN	Iowa City, Iowa	12	PBS
KIKU	Honolulu, Hawaii	20	ShopHQ
KILM	Inglewood, California	64	Bounce TV
KIMA-TV	Yakima, Washington	29	CBS
KIMT	Mason City, Iowa	3	CBS
KINC	Las Vegas, Nevada	15	Univision
KING-TV	Seattle, Washington	5	NBC
KINT-TV	El Paso, Texas	26	Univision
KION-TV	Monterey, California	46	CBS
KIPT	Twin Falls, Idaho	13	PBS
KIRO-TV	Seattle, Washington	7	CBS
KISU-TV	Pocatello, Idaho	10	PBS
KITU-TV	Beaumont, Texas	34	TBN
KITV	Honolulu, Hawaii	4	ABC
KIVI-TV	Nampa, Idaho	6	ABC
KIXE-TV	Redding, California	9	PBS
KJJC-TV	Great Falls, Montana	16	MeTV
KJLA	Ventura, California	57	Spanish Religious
KJNP-TV	North Pole, Alaska	4	TBN
KJRE	Ellendale, North Dakota	19	PBS
KJRH-TV	Tulsa, Oklahoma	2	NBC
KJRR	Jamestown, North Dakota	7	Fox
KJTL	Wichita Falls, Texas	18	Fox
KJTV-TV	Lubbock, Texas	34	Fox
KJUD	Juneau, Alaska	8	ABC
KJZZ-TV	Salt Lake City, Utah	14	Independent
KKAC	Carlsbad, New Mexico	19	Silent
KKAI	Kailua, Hawaii	50	Religious
KKAP	Little Rock, Arkansas	36	Daystar
KKCO	Grand Junction, Colorado	11	NBC
KKJB	Boise, Idaho	39	Telemundo
KKPX-TV	San Jose, California	65	Ion Television
KKTV	Colorado Springs, Colorado	11	CBS
KLAS-TV	Las Vegas, Nevada	8	CBS
KLAX-TV	Alexandria, Louisiana	31	ABC
KLBK-TV	Lubbock, Texas	13	CBS
KLBY	Colby, Kansas	4	ABC
KLCS	Los Angeles, California	58	PBS
KLCW-TV	Wolfforth, Texas	22	The CW
KLDO-TV	Laredo, Texas	27	Univision
KLEI	Wailuku, Hawaii	21	Telemundo
KLEW-TV	Lewiston, Idaho	3	CBS
KLFY-TV	Lafayette, Louisiana	10	CBS
KLJB	Davenport, Iowa	18	Fox
KLKN	Lincoln, Nebraska	8	ABC
KLML	Grand Junction, Colorado	20	Court TV
KLNE-TV	Lexington, Nebraska	3	PBS
KLPA-TV	Alexandria, Louisiana	25	PBS
KLPB-TV	Lafayette, Louisiana	24	PBS
KLRN	San Antonio, Texas	9	PBS
KLRT-TV	Little Rock, Arkansas	16	Fox
KLRU	Austin, Texas	18	PBS
KLSR-TV	Eugene, Oregon	34	Fox
KLST	San Angelo, Texas	8	CBS
KLTJ	Galveston, Texas	22	Daystar
KLTL-TV	Lake Charles, Louisiana	18	PBS
KLTM-TV	Monroe, Louisiana	13	PBS
KLTS-TV	Shreveport, Louisiana	24	PBS
KLTV	Tyler, Texas	7	ABC
KLUJ-TV	Harlingen, Texas	44	TBN
KLUZ-TV	Albuquerque, New Mexico	14	Univision
KLVX	Las Vegas, Nevada	10	PBS
KLWB	Lafayette, Louisiana	50	MeTV
KLWY	Cheyenne, Wyoming	27	Fox
KMAU	Wailuku, Hawaii	4	ABC
KMAX-TV	Sacramento, California	31	The CW
KMBC-TV	Kansas City, Missouri	9	ABC
KMCB	Coos Bay, Oregon	23	NBC
KMCC	Laughlin, Nevada	34	Ion Television
KMCI-TV	Lawrence, Kansas	38	Independent
KMCT-TV	West Monroe, Louisiana	39	Religious
KMCY	Minot, North Dakota	14	ABC
KMDE	Devils Lake, North Dakota	25	PBS
KMEB	Wailuku, Hawaii	10	PBS
KMEG	Sioux City, Iowa	14	Dabl
KMEX-DT	Los Angeles, California	34	Univision
KMGH-TV	Denver, Colorado	7	ABC
KMHC	Steamboat Springs, Colorado	24	Independent
KMID	Midland, Texas	2	ABC
KMIR-TV	Palm Springs, California	36	NBC
KMIZ	Columbia, Missouri	17	ABC
KMLM-DT	Odessa, Texas	43	God's Learning Channel
KMLU	Columbia, Louisiana	11	MeTV
KMNE-TV	Bassett, Nebraska	7	PBS
KMOH-TV	Kingman, Arizona	6	MeTV
KMOS-TV	Sedalia, Missouri	6	PBS
KMOT	Minot, North Dakota	10	NBC
KMOV	St. Louis, Missouri	4	CBS
KMPH-TV	Visalia, California	26	Fox
KMPX	Decatur, Texas	29	Estrella TV
KMSB	Tucson, Arizona	11	Fox
KMSP-TV	Minneapolis, Minnesota	9	Fox
KMSS-TV	Shreveport, Louisiana	33	Fox
KMTP-TV	San Francisco, California	32	Ethnic independent
KMTR	Eugene, Oregon	16	NBC
KMTV-TV	Omaha, Nebraska	3	CBS
KMTW	Hutchinson, Kansas	36	Dabl
KMVT	Twin Falls, Idaho	11	CBS
KMVU-DT	Medford, Oregon	26	Fox
KMYA-DT	Camden, Arkansas	49	MeTV
KMYS	Kerrville, Texas	35	Dabl
KMYT-TV	Tulsa, Oklahoma	41	MeTV
KMYU	St. George, Utah	12	MyNetworkTV
KNAT-TV	Albuquerque, New Mexico	23	TBN
KNAZ-TV	Flagstaff, Arizona	2	NBC
KNBC	Los Angeles, California	4	NBC
KNBN	Rapid City, South Dakota	21	NBC
KNCT	Belton, Texas	46	The CW
KNDB	Bismarck, North Dakota	26	Heroes & Icons
KNDM	Minot, North Dakota	24	Heroes & Icons
KNDO	Yakima, Washington	23	NBC
KNDU	Richland, Washington	25	NBC
KNEP	Scottsbluff, Nebraska	4	NBC
KNGF	Grand Forks, North Dakota	27	BEK Sports
KNHL	Hastings, Nebraska	5	The CW
KNIC-DT	Blanco, Texas	17	UniMás
KNIN-TV	Caldwell, Idaho	9	Fox
KNLC	St. Louis, Missouri	24	MeTV
KNMD-TV	Santa Fe, New Mexico	5	PBS
KNME-TV	Albuquerque, New Mexico	5	PBS
KNMT	Portland, Oregon	24	TBN
KNOE-TV	Monroe, Louisiana	8	CBS
KNOP-TV	North Platte, Nebraska	2	NBC
KNPB	Reno, Nevada	5	PBS
KNRR	Pembina, North Dakota	12	Fox
KNSD	San Diego, California	39	NBC
KNSN-TV	Reno, Nevada	21	MyNetworkTV
KNSO	Clovis, California	51	Telemundo
KNTV	San Jose, California	11	NBC
KNVA	Austin, Texas	54	The CW
KNVN	Chico, California	24	NBC
KNVO	McAllen, Texas	48	Univision
KNWA-TV	Rogers, Arkansas	51	NBC
KNXV-TV	Phoenix, Arizona	15	ABC
KOAA-TV	Pueblo, Colorado	5	NBC
KOAB-TV	Bend, Oregon	3	PBS
KOAC-TV	Corvallis, Oregon	7	PBS
KOAM-TV	Pittsburg, Kansas	7	CBS
KOAT-TV	Albuquerque, New Mexico	7	ABC
KOB	Albuquerque, New Mexico	4	NBC
KOBF	Farmington, New Mexico	12	NBC
KOBI	Medford, Oregon	5	NBC
KOBR	Roswell, New Mexico	8	NBC
KOCB	Oklahoma City, Oklahoma	34	The CW
KOCE-TV	Huntington Beach, California	50	PBS
KOCM	Norman, Oklahoma	46	Daystar
KOCO-TV	Oklahoma City, Oklahoma	5	ABC
KOCW	Hoisington, Kansas	17	Fox
KODE-TV	Joplin, Missouri	12	ABC
KOED-TV	Tulsa, Oklahoma	11	PBS
KOET	Eufaula, Oklahoma	3	PBS
KOFY-TV	San Francisco, California	20	Grit
KOGG	Wailuku, Hawaii	13	NBC
KOHD	Bend, Oregon	18	ABC
KOIN	Portland, Oregon	6	CBS
KOKH-TV	Oklahoma City, Oklahoma	25	Fox
KOKI-TV	Tulsa, Oklahoma	23	Roar
KOLD-TV	Tucson, Arizona	13	CBS
KOLN	Lincoln, Nebraska	10	CBS
KOLO-TV	Reno, Nevada	8	ABC
KOLR	Springfield, Missouri	10	CBS
KOMO-TV	Seattle, Washington	4	ABC
KOMU-TV	Columbia, Missouri	8	NBC
KONC	Alexandria, Minnesota	7	TCT
KONG	Everett, Washington	16	Independent
KOOD	Hays, Kansas	9	PBS
KOPB-TV	Portland, Oregon	10	PBS
KOPX-TV	Oklahoma City, Oklahoma	62	Ion Television
KORO	Corpus Christi, Texas	28	Univision
KOSA-TV	Odessa, Texas	7	CBS
KOTA-TV	Rapid City, South Dakota	3	ABC
KOTI	Klamath Falls, Oregon	2	NBC
KOTV-DT	Tulsa, Oklahoma	6	CBS
KOVR	Stockton	13	CBS
KOZJ	Joplin, Missouri	26	PBS
KOZK	Springfield, Missouri	21	PBS
KOZL-TV	Springfield, Missouri	27	MyNetworkTV
KPAX-TV	Missoula, Montana	8	CBS
KPAZ-TV	Phoenix, Arizona	21	TBN
KPBS	San Diego, California	15	PBS
KPBT-TV	Odessa, Texas	36	PBS
KPCB-DT	Snyder, Texas	17	God's Learning Channel
KPDX	Vancouver, Washington	49	MyNetworkTV
KPEJ-TV	Odessa, Texas	24	Fox
KPHO-TV	Phoenix, Arizona	5	CBS
KPIC	Roseburg, Oregon	4	CBS
KPIF	Pocatello, Idaho	15	Grit
KPIX-TV	San Francisco, California	5	CBS
KPJK	San Mateo, California	60	Educational independent
KPJR-TV	Greeley, Colorado	38	TBN
KPLC	Lake Charles, Louisiana	7	NBC
KPLO-TV	Reliance, South Dakota	6	CBS
KPLR-TV	St. Louis, Missouri	11	The CW
KPMR	Santa Barbara, California	38	Univision
KPNE-TV	North Platte, Nebraska	9	PBS
KPNX	Mesa, Arizona	12	NBC
KPNZ	Ogden, Utah	24	TCT
KPOB-TV	Poplar Bluff, Missouri	15	ABC
KPPX-TV	Tolleson, Arizona	51	Ion Television
KPRC-TV	Houston, Texas	2	NBC
KPRY-TV	Pierre, South Dakota	4	ABC
KPSD-TV	Eagle Butte, South Dakota	13	PBS
KPTB-DT	Lubbock, Texas	16	God's Learning Channel
KPTF-DT	Farwell, Texas	18	God's Learning Channel
KPTH	Sioux City, Iowa	44	Fox
KPTM	Omaha, Nebraska	42	Fox
KPTS	Hutchinson, Kansas	8	PBS
KPTV	Portland, Oregon	12	Fox
KPTW	Casper, Wyoming	6	PBS
KPVI-DT	Pocatello, Idaho	6	NBC
KPXB-TV	Conroe, Texas	49	Ion Television
KPXC-TV	Denver, Colorado	59	Ion Television
KPXD-TV	Arlington, Texas	68	Ion Television
KPXE-TV	Kansas City, Missouri	50	Ion Television
KPXG-TV	Salem, Oregon	22	Ion Television
KPXJ	Minden, Louisiana	21	The CW
KPXL-TV	Uvalde, Texas	26	Ion Television
KPXM-TV	St. Cloud, Minnesota	41	Ion Television
KPXN-TV	San Bernardino, California	30	Ion Television
KPXO-TV	Kaneohe, Hawaii	66	Ion Television
KPXR-TV	Cedar Rapids, Iowa	48	Ion Television
KPYX	San Francisco, California	44	Independent
KQCA	Stockton, California	58	MyNetworkTV
KQCD-TV	Dickinson, North Dakota	7	NBC
KQCK	Cheyenne, Wyoming	33	CTN
KQCW-DT	Tulsa, Oklahoma	19	The CW
KQDS-TV	Duluth, Minnesota	21	Fox
KQED	San Francisco, California	9	PBS
KQEH	San Jose, California	54	PBS
KQET	Watsonville, California	25	PBS
KQIN	Davenport, Iowa	36	PBS
KQME	Lead, South Dakota	10	MeTV
KQSD-TV	Lowry, South Dakota	11	PBS
KQSL	Cloverdale, California	8	TLN
KQTV	St. Joseph, Missouri	2	ABC
KQUP	Pullman, Washington	24	Blank
KRBC-TV	Abilene, Texas	9	NBC
KRBK	Osage Beach, Missouri	49	Fox
KRCA	Riverside, California	62	Estrella TV
KRCB	Cotati, California	22	PBS
KRCG	Jefferson City, Missouri	13	CBS
KRCR-TV	Redding, California	7	ABC
KRCW-TV	Salem, Oregon	32	The CW
KRDK-TV	Valley City, North Dakota	4	Cozi TV/MyNetworkTV
KRDO-TV	Colorado Springs, Colorado	13	ABC
KREG-TV	Glenwood Springs, Colorado	3	MeTV
KREM	Spokane, Washington	2	CBS
KREN-TV	Reno, Nevada	27	Univision
KREX-TV	Grand Junction, Colorado	5	CBS
KREY-TV	Montrose, Colorado	10	CBS
KREZ-TV	Durango, Colorado	6	CBS
KRGV-TV	Weslaco, Texas	5	ABC
KRII	Chisholm, Minnesota	11	NBC
KRIN	Waterloo, Iowa	32	PBS
KRIS-TV	Corpus Christi, Texas	6	NBC
KRIV	Houston, Texas	26	Fox
KRMA-TV	Denver, Colorado	6	PBS
KRMJ	Grand Junction, Colorado	18	PBS
KRMT	Denver, Colorado	41	Daystar
KRMU	Durango, Colorado	20	PBS
KRNE-TV	Merriman, Nebraska	12	PBS
KRNV-DT	Reno, Nevada	4	NBC
KRON-TV	San Francisco, California	4	MyNetworkTV
KRPV-DT	Roswell, New Mexico	27	God's Learning Channel
KRQE	Albuquerque, New Mexico	13	CBS
KRSU-TV	Claremore, Oklahoma	35	Educational independent
KRTN-TV	Durango, Colorado	33	Charge!
KRTV	Great Falls, Montana	3	CBS
KRWB-TV	Roswell, New Mexico	21	The CW
KRWF	Redwood Falls, Minnesota	43	ABC
KRWG-TV	Las Cruces, New Mexico	22	PBS
KRXI-TV	Reno, Nevada	11	Fox
KSAN-TV	San Angelo, Texas	3	NBC
KSAS-TV	Wichita, Kansas	24	Fox
KSAT-TV	San Antonio, Texas	12	ABC
KSAX	Alexandria, Minnesota	42	ABC
KSAZ-TV	Phoenix, Arizona	10	Fox
KSBI	Oklahoma City, Oklahoma	52	MyNetworkTV
KSBW	Salinas, California	8	NBC
KSBY	San Luis Obispo, California	6	NBC
KSCC	Corpus Christi, Texas	38	Fox
KSCE	El Paso, Texas	38	Religious
KSCI	Long Beach, California	18	ShopHQ
KSCN-TV	Los Angeles, California	22	Scientology Network
KSCW-DT	Wichita, Kansas	33	The CW
KSDK	St. Louis, Missouri	5	NBC
KSEE	Fresno, California	24	NBC
KSFL-TV	Sioux Falls, South Dakota	36	YTA TV
KSFY-TV	Sioux Falls, South Dakota	13	ABC
KSGW-TV	Sheridan, Wyoming	12	ABC
KSHB-TV	Kansas City, Missouri	41	NBC
KSHV-TV	Shreveport, Louisiana	45	MyNetworkTV
KSIN-TV	Sioux City, Iowa	27	PBS
KSIX-TV	Hilo, Hawaii	13	NBC
KSKN	Spokane, Washington	22	The CW
KSL-TV	Salt Lake City, Utah	5	NBC
KSLA	Shreveport, Louisiana	12	CBS
KSMN	Worthington, Minnesota	20	PBS
KSMO-TV	Kansas City, Missouri	62	MyNetworkTV
KSMQ-TV	Austin, Minnesota	15	PBS
KSMS-TV	Monterey, California	67	Univision
KSNB-TV	Superior, Nebraska	4	NBC
KSNC	Great Bend, Kansas	2	NBC
KSNF	Joplin, Missouri	16	NBC
KSNG	Garden City, Kansas	11	NBC
KSNK	McCook, Nebraska	8	NBC
KSNT	Topeka, Kansas	27	NBC
KSNV	Las Vegas, Nevada	3	NBC
KSNW	Wichita, Kansas	3	NBC
KSPS-TV	Spokane, Washington	7	PBS
KSPX-TV	Sacramento, California	29	Ion Television
KSQA	Topeka, Kansas	12	The Country Network
KSRE	Minot, North Dakota	6	PBS
KSTC-TV	Minneapolis, Minnesota	5	Independent
KSTF	Scottsbluff, Nebraska	10	CBS
KSTP-TV	St. Paul, Minnesota	5	ABC
KSTR-DT	Irving, Texas	49	UniMás
KSTS	San Jose, California	48	Telemundo
KSTU	Salt Lake City, Utah	13	Fox
KSTW	Tacoma, Washington	11	The CW
KSVI	Billings, Montana	6	ABC
KSWB-TV	San Diego, California	69	Fox
KSWK	Lakin, Kansas	3	PBS
KSWO-TV	Lawton, Oklahoma	7	ABC
KSYS	Medford, Oregon	8	PBS
KTAB-TV	Abilene, Texas	32	CBS
KTAJ-TV	St. Joseph, Missouri	16	TBN
KTAL-TV	Texarkana, Texas	6	NBC
KTAS	San Luis Obispo, California	33	Telemundo
KTAZ	Phoenix, Arizona	39	Telemundo
KTBC	Austin, Texas	7	Fox
KTBN-TV	Santa Ana, California	40	TBN
KTBO-TV	Oklahoma City, Oklahoma	14	TBN
KTBS-TV	Shreveport, Louisiana	3	ABC
KTBU	Conroe, Texas	55	Quest
KTBW-TV	Tacoma, Washington	20	TBN
KTBY	Anchorage, Alaska	4	Fox
KTCA-TV	Minneapolis, Minnesota	2	PBS
KTCI-TV	St. Paul, Minnesota	2	PBS
KTCW	Roseburg, Oregon	46	NBC
KTDO	Las Cruces, New Mexico	48	Telemundo
KTEJ	Jonesboro, Arkansas	19	PBS
KTEL-TV	Carlsbad, New Mexico	25	MeTV
KTEN	Ada, Oklahoma	10	NBC
KTFD-TV	Denver, Colorado	50	UniMás
KTFF-DT	Porterville, California	61	UniMás
KTFK-DT	Stockton, California	64	UniMás
KTFN	El Paso, Texas	65	UniMás
KTFQ-TV	Albuquerque, New Mexico	41	UniMás
KTGM	Tamuning, Guam	14	ABC
KTHV	Little Rock, Arkansas	11	CBS
KTIN	Fort Dodge, Iowa	21	PBS
KTIV	Sioux City, Iowa	4	NBC
KTKA-TV	Topeka, Kansas	49	ABC
KTLA	Los Angeles, California	5	The CW
KTLM	Rio Grande City, Texas	40	Telemundo
KTLN-TV	San Francisco, California	68	Heroes & Icons
KTMD	Galveston, Texas	47	Telemundo
KTMF	Missoula, Montana	23	ABC
KTMW	Salt Lake City, Utah	20	Telemundo
KTNC-TV	Concord, California	42	TCT
KTNE-TV	Alliance, Nebraska	13	PBS
KTNL-TV	Sitka, Alaska	7	CBS
KTNV-TV	Las Vegas, Nevada	13	ABC
KTNW	Richland, Washington	31	PBS
KTOO-TV	Juneau, Alaska	3	PBS
KTPX-TV	Okmulgee, Oklahoma	44	Ion Television
KTRE	Lufkin, Texas	9	ABC
KTRK-TV	Houston, Texas	13	ABC
KTRV-TV	Nampa, Idaho	12	Ion Television
KTSC	Pueblo, Colorado	8	PBS
KTSD-TV	Pierre, South Dakota	10	PBS
KTSF	San Francisco, California	26	Ethnic independent
KTSM-TV	El Paso, Texas	9	NBC
KTTC	Rochester, Minnesota	10	NBC
KTTM	Huron, South Dakota	7	TCT
KTTU	Tucson, Arizona	18	MyNetworkTV
KTTV	Los Angeles, California	11	Fox
KTTW	Sioux Falls, South Dakota	7	TCT
KTTZ-TV	Lubbock, Texas	5	PBS
KTUL	Tulsa, Oklahoma	8	ABC
KTUU-TV	Anchorage, Alaska	2	NBC
KTUZ-TV	Shawnee, Oklahoma	30	Telemundo
KTVA	Anchorage, Alaska	11	Rewind TV
KTVB	Boise, Idaho	7	NBC
KTVC	Roseburg, Oregon	36	3ABN
KTVD	Denver, Colorado	20	MyNetworkTV
KTVE	El Dorado, Arkansas	10	NBC
KTVF	Fairbanks, Alaska	11	NBC
KTVH-DT	Helena, Montana	12	NBC
KTVI	St. Louis, Missouri	2	Fox
KTVK	Phoenix, Arizona	3	Independent
KTVL	Medford, Oregon	10	CBS
KTVM-TV	Butte, Montana	6	NBC
KTVN	Reno, Nevada	2	CBS
KTVO	Kirksville, Missouri	3	ABC
KTVQ	Billings, Montana	2	CBS
KTVR	La Grande, Oregon	13	PBS
KTVT	Fort Worth, Texas	11	CBS
KTVU	Oakland, California	2	Fox
KTVW-DT	Phoenix, Arizona	33	Univision
KTVX	Salt Lake City, Utah	4	ABC
KTVZ	Bend, Oregon	21	NBC
KTWO-TV	Casper, Wyoming	2	ABC
KTWU	Topeka, Kansas	11	PBS
KTXA	Fort Worth, Texas	21	Independent
KTXD-TV	Greenville, Texas	47	Merit TV
KTXH	Houston, Texas	20	MyNetworkTV
KTXL	Sacramento, California	40	Fox
KTXS-TV	Sweetwater, Texas	12	ABC
KUAC-TV	Fairbanks, Alaska	9	PBS
KUAM-TV	Hagåtña, Guam	8	NBC/CBS
KUAS-TV	Tucson, Arizona	27	PBS
KUAT-TV	Tucson, Arizona	6	PBS
KUBD	Ketchikan, Alaska	5	CBS
KUBE-TV	Baytown, Texas	57	ShopHQ
KUCW	Ogden, Utah	30	The CW
KUED	Salt Lake City, Utah	7	PBS
KUEN	Salt Lake City, Utah	9	Utah Education Network
KUES	Richfield, Utah	19	PBS
KUEW	St. George, Utah	18	PBS
KUFM-TV	Missoula, Montana	11	PBS
KUGF-TV	Great Falls, Montana	21	PBS
KUHM-TV	Helena, Montana	10	PBS
KUHT	Houston, Texas	8	PBS
KUID-TV	Moscow, Idaho	12	PBS
KUKL-TV	Kalispell, Montana	46	PBS
KULR-TV	Billings, Montana	8	NBC
KUMV-TV	Williston, North Dakota	8	NBC
KUNP	La Grande, Oregon	16	Univision
KUNS-TV	Bellevue, Washington	51	Univision
KUOK	Woodward, Oklahoma	35	Univision
KUON-TV	Lincoln, Nebraska	12	PBS
KUPB	Midland, Texas	18	Univision
KUPK	Garden City, Kansas	13	ABC
KUPT	Hobbs, New Mexico	29	Cozi TV
KUPU	Waimanalo, Hawaii	56	Cozi TV
KUPX-TV	Provo, Utah	16	Ion Television
KUSA	Denver, Colorado	9	NBC
KUSD-TV	Vermillion, South Dakota	2	PBS
KUSI-TV	San Diego, California	51	Independent
KUSM-TV	Bozeman, Montana	9	PBS
KUTF	Logan, Utah	12	Daystar
KUTH-DT	Provo, Utah	32	Univision
KUTP	Phoenix, Arizona	45	MyNetworkTV
KUTV	Salt Lake City, Utah	2	CBS
KUVE-DT	Green Valley, Arizona	46	Univision
KUVI-DT	Bakersfield, California	45	Twist
KUVN-DT	Garland, Texas	23	Univision
KUVS-DT	Modesto, California	19	Univision
KVAL-TV	Eugene, Oregon	13	CBS
KVAW	Eagle Pass, Texas	16	Blank
KVCR-DT	San Bernardino, California	24	PBS
KVCT	Victoria, Texas	19	Fox
KVCW	Las Vegas, Nevada	33	The CW
KVDA	San Antonio, Texas	60	Telemundo
KVEA	Corona, California	52	Telemundo
KVEO-TV	Brownsville, Texas	23	NBC
KVEW	Kennewick, Washington	42	ABC
KVHP	Lake Charles, Louisiana	29	Fox
KVIA-TV	El Paso, Texas	7	ABC
KVIE	Sacramento, California	6	PBS
KVIH-TV	Clovis, New Mexico	12	ABC
KVII-TV	Amarillo, Texas	7	ABC
KVLY-TV	Fargo, North Dakota	11	NBC
KVMD	Twentynine Palms, California	31	NTD
KVME-TV	Bishop, California	20	Jewelry Television
KVOA	Tucson, Arizona	4	NBC
KVOS-TV	Bellingham, Washington	12	Heroes & Icons
KVPT	Fresno, California	18	PBS
KVRR	Fargo, North Dakota	15	Fox
KVSN-DT	Pueblo, Colorado	48	Univision
KVTH-DT	Hot Springs, Arkansas	26	Religious
KVTJ-DT	Jonesboro, Arkansas	48	Religious
KVTN-DT	Pine Bluff, Arkansas	25	Religious
KVUE	Austin, Texas	24	ABC
KVUI	Pocatello, Idaho	31	Ion Television
KVVU-TV	Henderson, Nevada	5	Fox
KVYE	El Centro, California	7	Univision
KWBA-TV	Sierra Vista, Arizona	58	The CW
KWBM	Harrison, Arkansas	31	Daystar
KWBN	Honolulu, Hawaii	44	Daystar
KWBQ	Santa Fe, New Mexico	19	The CW
KWCH-DT	Hutchinson, Kansas	12	CBS
KWCM-TV	Appleton, Minnesota	10	PBS
KWDK	Tacoma, Washington	56	Daystar
KWES-TV	Odessa, Texas	9	NBC
KWET	Cheyenne, Oklahoma	12	PBS
KWEX-DT	San Antonio, Texas	41	Univision
KWGN-TV	Denver, Colorado	2	The CW
KWHB	Tulsa, Oklahoma	47	CTN
KWHE	Honolulu, Hawaii	14	Religious
KWHY	Garden Grove, California	63	Canal de la Fe
KWKB	Iowa City, Iowa	20	TCT
KWKS	Colby, Kansas	19	PBS
KWKT-TV	Waco, Texas	44	Fox
KWNB-TV	Hayes Center, Nebraska	6	ABC
KWOG	Springdale, Arkansas	57	Daystar
KWPX-TV	Bellevue, Washington	33	Ion Television
KWQC-TV	Davenport, Iowa	6	NBC
KWSE	Williston, North Dakota	4	PBS
KWSU-TV	Pullman, Washington	10	PBS
KWTV-DT	Oklahoma City, Oklahoma	9	CBS
KWTX-TV	Waco, Texas	10	CBS
KWWL	Waterloo, Iowa	7	NBC
KWWT	Odessa, Texas	30	MyNetworkTV
KWYB	Butte, Montana	18	ABC
KWYP-DT	Laramie, Wyoming	8	PBS
KXAN-TV	Austin, Texas	36	NBC
KXAS-TV	Fort Worth, Texas	5	NBC
KXGN-TV	Glendive, Montana	5	CBS/NBC
KXII	Sherman, Texas	12	CBS
KXLA	Rancho Palos Verdes, California	44	Ethnic independent
KXLF-TV	Butte, Montana	4	CBS
KXLN-DT	Rosenberg, Texas	45	Univision
KXLT-TV	Rochester, Minnesota	47	Fox
KXLY-TV	Spokane, Washington	4	ABC
KXMA-TV	Dickinson, North Dakota	2	The CW
KXMB-TV	Bismarck, North Dakota	12	CBS
KXMC-TV	Minot, North Dakota	13	CBS
KXMD-TV	Williston, North Dakota	11	CBS
KXNE-TV	Norfolk, Nebraska	19	PBS
KXNW	Eureka Springs, Arkansas	34	MyNetworkTV
KXRM-TV	Colorado Springs, Colorado	21	Fox
KXTF	Twin Falls, Idaho	35	TCT
KXTV	Sacramento, California	10	ABC
KXTX-TV	Dallas, Texas	39	Telemundo
KXVA	Abilene, Texas	15	Fox
KXVO	Omaha, Nebraska	15	TBD
KXXV	Waco, Texas	25	ABC
KYAZ	Katy, Texas	51	MeTV
KYIN	Mason City, Iowa	24	PBS
KYLE-TV	Bryan, Texas	28	MyNetworkTV
KYMA-DT	Yuma, Arizona	13	NBC
KYNE-TV	Omaha, Nebraska	26	PBS
KYOU-TV	Ottumwa, Iowa	15	Fox
KYTV	Springfield, Missouri	3	NBC
KYTX	Nacogdoches, Texas	19	CBS
KYUR	Anchorage, Alaska	13	ABC
KYUS-TV	Miles City, Montana	3	NBC
KYVE	Yakima, Washington	47	PBS
KYVV-TV	Del Rio, Texas	10	Grit
KYW-TV	Philadelphia, Pennsylvania	3	CBS
KZJL	Houston, Texas	61	Estrella TV
KZJO	Seattle, Washington	22	MyNetworkTV
KZSD-TV	Martin, South Dakota	8	PBS
KZTV	Corpus Christi, Texas	10	CBS

== See also ==
- Call signs in North America#United States
- List of United States over-the-air television networks
