= Media in Hawaii =

The state of Hawaii has the following popular media:

== Newspapers ==
The first newspaper was Ka Lama Hawaii, printed by the students of Lorrin Andrews in 1834.

Honolulu is served by one daily Newspaper, The Honolulu Star-Advertiser, owned by Black Press of British Columbia in Canada. The Star-Advertiser began publishing on June 7, 2010, after Black Press merged Honolulu's two daily newspapers, The Honolulu Advertiser and the Honolulu Star-Bulletin. The Star-Bulletin was the primary competitor to the Advertiser until it scaled back statewide distribution. In 2010 Gannett Company sold the Advertiser to Black Press. The merger was due to a failure to find a buyer for the Star-Bulletin, which had been losing money and subscribers since the two broke off their joint operation agreement in 2001.

Maui is served by The Maui News, which is owned by Ogden Newspapers Inc. Maui's independent weekly newspaper is Maui Time Weekly. Other locally published newspapers are available to residents of the various islands, such as the Hawaii Tribune-Herald in Hilo and West Hawaii Today in Kailua-Kona, both on The Big Island, and The Garden Island, based in Lihue on Kauai. Oahu Publications Inc owns West Hawaii Today, Hawaii Tribune-Herald, MidWeek, and the Honolulu Star-Advertiser.

The Hawaiian business community is served by the Pacific Business News and Hawaii Business Magazine. The largest religious community in Hawaii is served by the Hawaii Catholic Herald. Honolulu Magazine is a popular magazine that offers local interest news and feature articles. Apart from the mainstream press, the state also enjoys a vibrant ethnic publication presence with newspapers for the Chinese, Filipino, Japanese, Korean and Native Hawaiian communities. There was an alternative weekly, the Honolulu Weekly which served the urban Honolulu area until 2012. HawaiiFreePress.com is an online newspaper with a statewide reach, focusing on local news and investigative journalism.

== Radio ==
=== Terrestrial ===
Hawaii has 73 FM and 32 AM radio stations:

- 23 FM 20 AM in Honolulu County
- 22 FM, 6 AM in Hawaii County
- 17 FM, 4 AM in Maui County
- 11 FM, 2 AM in Kauai County

Honolulu is the only Nielsen Audio-rated radio market in Hawaii. Among the major companies that own stations in Hawaii include Salem Communications, Summit Media, iHeartMedia, HH Media and Ohana Family. All of these companies have offices in Honolulu. Among the non-commercial FM broadcast licence holders are KKCR - Kaua`i Community Radio - the only full-power community radio station in Hawai`i, broadcasting across the islands of Ni`ihau, Kaua`i, and O`ahu, Manao Radio, an LPFM station broadcasting on Maui, and HPR - Hawai`i Public Radio - a full-power NPR affiliate, broadcasting from O`ahu, with translators across the islands.

=== Satellite ===
The state of Hawaii was not initially serviced by satellite radio and was not receivable with the exception of certain cellular devices and the internet. This changed in 2011, when Sirius XM Radio was given a green light to place a 1.8-kW transmitter in Honolulu after receiving approval from the FCC to begin transmission to Hawaii and Alaska. Sirius XM had been trying to expand service into Hawaii since 2007 but had opposition from the Hawaii Association of Broadcasters fearing loss of local competition. The FCC rejected their petition.

== Television ==
All of the major American broadcast television networks are represented in Hawaii through KHON-TV (Fox, The CW on DT2), KITV (ABC; Me-TV Hawaii on DT2), KGMB (CBS, This TV on DT2), KHII-TV (MyNetworkTV), KHET (PBS), KHNL (NBC, Antenna TV on DT2), and KPXO-TV (ION Television). Two independent stations, KIKU-TV and KBFD, specialize in multi-cultural programs serving Asian audiences. KFVE serves Honolulu's Hispanic population with Telemundo programming and is the only Spanish-language TV outlet in the state since 2017, following the closure of low-powered Univision affiliate KHLU-CD in 2016; Univision and UniMás are available on Spectrum, Hawaiian Telcom, Dish, and DirecTV. From Honolulu, programming at these stations can be seen on the various other islands via networks of satellite transmitters and through Oceanic Time Warner Cable. Until the advent of satellite, most network programming was broadcast a week behind mainland scheduling.

There are also five stations in Honolulu that offer religious programming, the most of any US television market: KWHE (FBC), KAAH-TV (TBN), KALO (Ind.), KWBN (Daystar) and KUPU (Ind.). Another outlet, KKAI, also offered religious programming but since 2012 shifted to airing general interest shows, with KKAI dropping Faith TV for RTV. KUPU which first signed on with religious programming, joined Antenna TV in 2011 but would return to becoming an independent in May 2012 and by January 2013 transitioned to Catholic programming, which lasted until September 2017 when it affiliated with Cozi TV. KWHE, KAAH-TV, and KALO also have satellite stations across the state (except Kauai), with KWHE being the only outlet in Hawaii to air secular general-interest shows and sports programs outside its non-secular hours. KUPU offers programming from the Pacific Islands alongside their religious fare.

Of the major television stations in Honolulu, only KITV airs a midday newscast as of August 2018; KITV and KHNL had broadcast mid-morning newscasts in the past. All of the stations generally follow the 7:00 pm (6:00 pm on Sundays) to 10:00 pm primetime television schedule pattern used in the Central and Pacific time zones and air live sporting events at the same time as the mainland United States (i.e., Sunday NFL games on KHON and KGMB start at 7:00 am or 8:00 am local time, which is 1:00 pm Eastern time/10:00 am Pacific time on the mainland).

As of 2012, KITV is the only outlet in Hawaii to air as many as 27 news hours per week. They are also the only station in the state to air hour-long 6:00 pm and 10:00 pm newscasts and the first to launch a weekend morning newscast, which airs from 6:00 to 8:00 AM.

The future of television broadcasts in Hawaii took a major turn down the road on August 18, 2009, when KGMB's owner, MGC Capital Corporation, and Raycom Media, owners of KHNL and KFVE, announced a shared services agreement under which Raycom merged the three stations' operations. KGMB relocated their operations to the building that houses the KHNL/KFVE operations, and the stations' news operations were consolidated under one umbrella. Non-news programming arrangements remained in place, though KGMB and KFVE would see their channel positions in Honolulu swapped—with KFVE and its programming moving to channel 9 (under MCG ownership) and KGMB and its CBS programming moving to channel 5 (under Raycom ownership). The change took place on October 26, 2009, with all three stations' newscasts merged into one major broadcast under the banner "Hawaii News Now." In addition, all three stations' logos were retired as well. This combination allowed the Hawaii News Now group to control 45% of the market.

Raycom President/CEO Paul McTear said the SSA would "preserve three stations that provide important and valuable local, national and international programming to viewers in Hawaii." The plan, however, has met with criticism from organizations such as Media Council Hawaii, which viewed the plan as a way to circumvent FCC rules preventing one company owning two of the top four stations in any market. An estimated 68 positions from a total of 198 from the three stations would be eliminated as part of the agreement.

Beginning in 2016, the Hawaii News Now (HNN) group of KGMB, KHNL, and KFVE severed ties to the Nielsen ratings. After the November 25 sweeps, Raycom media will use other research to track KHNL and KGMB audiences. KFVE, owned by HITV, will be affected also. In Hawaii, Nielsen does not use electronic means to track audiences. Recently, only 914 of the printed Nielsen booklets, known as monthly diaries, were completed out of 11,400 diaries. On January 9, 2016, KITV, as well as its second digital channel MeTV, announced that it changed from Nielsen to Rentrak. KHON will continue to use Nielsen ratings.

The various production companies that work with the major networks have produced television series and other projects in Hawaii. Most notable were police dramas like Magnum, P.I.and Hawaii Five-O (including its 2010 remake). Although not set in Hawaii, the settings and locations for Lost was produced and filmed in the state. The Brian Keith Show, an NBC sitcom which aired from 1972 to 1974, was set in Hawaii. Currently, hit TV shows like Dog the Bounty Hunter and the updated Hawaii Five-0 are filmed in the Hawaiian Islands. A comprehensive list of such projects can be seen at the list of Hawaii television series.

== Film ==
Hawaii has a growing film industry administered by the state through the Hawaii Film Office. Several television shows, movies, and various other media projects were produced in the Hawaiian Islands, taking advantage of the natural scenic landscapes as backdrops. Notable films produced in Hawaii or inspired by Hawaii include Hawaii, Blue Hawaii, Donovan's Reef, From Here to Eternity, In Harm's Way, South Pacific, Raiders of the Lost Ark, Jurassic Park, Picture Bride, Lani Loa, Outbreak, Waterworld, Six Days Seven Nights, George of the Jungle, 50 First Dates, Pearl Harbor, Godzilla, Blue Crush, The Even Stevens Movie, Race the Sun, Princess Kaiulani, and Lilo & Stitch. The film Snakes on a Plane, Forgetting Sarah Marshall takes place on a flight departing Hawaii for the U.S. mainland. In addition the island scenes from ABC's series Lost are almost entirely filmed on the island of Oahu. Hawaii is home to the Hawaii International Film Festival.

== Online Media ==
Hawaii has a vibrant online community including a host of blogs and publications specific to the islands. Some of these online efforts are produced by print or broadcast media companies while others are produced by bloggers and smaller media entities. Hawaii Magazine runs a blog with regular coverage and images from the islands. Hawaiirama and BeatofHawaii are two of the more popular independent travel blogs covering Hawaii. Hawaii on TV and Maui on TV are internet TV networks in Hawaii which broadcast first-run content via the World Wide Web.

Honolulu Civil Beat is a nonprofit online news organization covering the U.S. state of Hawaii. It specializes in investigative reporting, watchdog journalism and in-depth enterprise coverage.

‘Ōiwi TV is a media outlet that focuses on Native Hawaiian perspective. Most of its content is in Hawaiian.
