= List of television stations in Hawaii =

This is a list of broadcast television stations that are licensed in the U.S. state of Hawaii. Each of the three municipal counties — Honolulu County, Maui County and Hawaii County — has its own set of stations. Kauaʻi County has repeaters which broadcast Honolulu's stations through its islands.

== Full-power ==
- Stations are arranged by media market served and channel position.

Full-power television stations in Hawaii
Media market	Station	Channel	Primary affiliation(s)	Notes	Refs
Hilo	KHVO	4	ABC	(Note: Satellite of KITV.)	
Hilo	KGMD-TV	9	MyNetworkTV	(Note: Satellite of KHII-TV.)	
Hilo	KHAW-TV	11	Fox, The CW on 11.2	(Note: Satellite of KHON-TV.)	
Hilo	KSIX-TV	13	NBC, Independent on 13.2, CBS on 13.3	(Note: Satellite of KHNL.)	
Hilo	KEKE	14	Independent		
Honolulu	KHON-TV	2	Fox, The CW on 2.2		
Honolulu	KITV	4	ABC		
Honolulu	KGMB	5	CBS		
Honolulu	KHII-TV	9	MyNetworkTV		
Honolulu	KHET	11	PBS		
Honolulu	KHNL	13	NBC, Independent on 13.2, Telemundo on 13.6		
Honolulu	KWHE	14	Religious independent		
Honolulu	KIKU	20	Independent		
Honolulu	KAAH-TV	26	TBN		
Honolulu	KBFD-DT	32	Independent		
Honolulu	KALO	38	Independent		
Honolulu	KWBN	44	Daystar		
Honolulu	KKAI	50	Various subchannels	(Note: Licensed to Kailua, Hawaii.)	
Honolulu	KUPU	56	Various subchannels	(Note: Licensed to Waimānalo, Hawaii.)	
Honolulu	KPXO-TV	66	Ion Television	(Note: Licensed to Kāneʻohe, Hawaii.)	
Wailuku	KMAU	4	ABC		
Wailuku	KFVE	6	Telemundo, Independent on 6.2	(Note: Licensed to Kailua-Kona, Hawaii.)	
Wailuku	KAII-TV	7	Fox, The CW on 7.2		
Wailuku	KGMV	9	MyNetworkTV		
Wailuku	KMEB	10	PBS	(Note: Satellite of KHET.)	
Wailuku	KOGG	13	NBC, Independent on 13.2, CBS on 13.3		
Wailuku	KLEI	21	Independent, Telemundo on 21.2		

== Low-power ==
Low-power television stations in Hawaii
Media market	Station	Channel	Network	Notes	Refs
Honolulu	KHHI-LD	48	[Blank]		

== Translators ==
Television station translators in Hawaii
Media market	Station	Channel	Translating	Notes	Refs
Hilo	K36OZ-D	10	KMEB	(Note: Licensed to Hakalau, Hawaii.)	
Hilo	K35II-D	10	KMEB	(Note: Licensed to South Point, Hawaii.)	
Hilo	K31IZ-D	10	KMEB	(Note: Licensed to Nāʻālehu, Hawaii.)	
Hilo	K28JV-D	10	KMEB		
Hilo	K19JW-D	10	KMEB	(Note: Licensed to Mauna Loa, Hawaii.)	
Hilo	K20NX-D	45	KGMB		
Lihue	K30JE-D	11	KHET		
Lihue	K34IS-D	11	KHET	(Note: Licensed to Kīlauea, Hawaii.)	
Lihue	K29HL-D	11	KHET	(Note: Licensed to Hanalei, Hawaii.)	
Lihue	K21IA-D	11	KHET	(Note: Licensed to Waipake, Hawaii.)	
Lihue	K36IJ-D	11	KHET	(Note: Licensed to Anahola, Hawaii.)	
Lihue	K32IX-D	13	KHNL		
Wailuku	K28JM-D	10	KMEB	(Note: Licensed to Waimea, Hawaii.)	
Wailuku	K28NN-D	28	KGMB		

== Defunct ==
- KHVH-TV Honolulu (1957–1958)

== Other islands ==
Many inhabited areas of Molokai and Lanai are within range of TV stations and repeaters located on facing areas of Oahu and Maui. Likewise, viewers on Niʻihau are served by transmitters on the west of Kauai.

== Early conversion to digital ==
On January 15, 2009, Hawaii became the first state in the United States to permanently have its television stations switch from analog to digital early. Hawaii's full-power TV stations, including network affiliates and independent stations, ceased analog broadcasting at noon on that date. With the exception of residents on Kauai, households that receive TV signals over the air will need to connect a converter box to sets in order to continue watching TV, since Kauai is the only part of Hawaii that receives over-the-air television signals via low-power translators that are not affected by the DTV transition.

Existing analog facilities at Maui's Haleakalā volcano are to be removed due to ongoing interference with astronomy equipment operated under the United States Department of Defense and the University of Hawaiʻi. The digital stations are being deployed using new facilities at Ulupalakua and the old towers will be removed before the Hawaiian petrels' nesting season begins in March. By making the switch early, the broadcast towers atop Haleakalā near the birds' nesting grounds can be dismantled without interfering with their habits.
