= List of independent television stations in the United States =

This is a list of independent television stations in the United States, which have no designated network affiliation.

† refers to a religious independent station
‡ refers to a non-commercial, multicultural, ethnic or educational independent station

List of independent television stations
Media market	State/Dist./Terr.	Station	Channel	Notes
Birmingham	Alabama	WABM	68	
Birmingham	Alabama	WOTM-LD	19	
Huntsville	Alabama	WZDX	54.2	
Mobile	Alabama	WFGX	35	
Anchorage	Alaska	KAUU	5.4	
Anchorage	Alaska	KCFT-CD	35	†
Fairbanks	Alaska	KFXF-CD	7	
Fairbanks	Alaska	KTVF	11.2	(Note: Translator of KFXF-CD.)
Phoenix	Arizona	KASW	61	
Phoenix	Arizona	KAZT-CD	7.2	(Note: Translator of KAZT-TV.)
Phoenix	Arizona	KAZT-TV	7.2	
Phoenix	Arizona	KTVK	3	
Phoenix	Arizona	KUTP	45	
Tucson	Arizona	KTTU-TV	18.2	
Tucson	Arizona	KWBA-TV	58	
Fort Smith–Fayetteville	Arkansas	KXNW	34	
Little Rock	Arkansas	KARZ-TV	42	
Chico–Redding	California	KRVU-LD	22	
Chico–Redding	California	KZVU-LD	21	
Eureka	California	KECA-LD	29.2	
Fresno	California	KNXT-LD	53	
Los Angeles	California	KCAL-TV	9	
Los Angeles	California	KCOP-TV	13	
Los Angeles	California	KJLA	57	†‡
Los Angeles	California	KVMD	31	‡
Los Angeles	California	KWHY	63	†‡
Los Angeles	California	KXLA	44	‡
Modesto	California	KBSV	23	‡
Monterey	California	KAAP-LD	2	
Palm Springs	California	KPSE-LD	50	
Sacramento	California	KBTV-CD	8	‡
Sacramento	California	KMAX-TV	31	
San Diego	California	KFMB-TV	8.2	
San Francisco	California	KICU-TV	36	
San Francisco	California	KMTP-TV	32	‡
San Francisco	California	KPYX	44	
San Francisco	California	KPJK	60	‡
San Francisco	California	KTSF	26	‡
San Luis Obispo	California	KEYT-TV	3.2	
Denver	Colorado	KCDO-TV	3	
Denver	Colorado	KSBS-CD	10	
Denver	Colorado	KTVD	20	
Durango	Colorado	KREZ-TV	6.2	(Note: Satellite of KRQE)
Grand Junction	Colorado	KGJT-CD	27	
Grand Junction	Colorado	KREX-TV	5.3	(Note: Relay of KGJT-CD.)
Hartford–New Haven	Connecticut	WCTX	59	
Hartford–New Haven	Connecticut	WWAX-LD	27	
Washington, D.C.	District of Columbia	WDCA	20	
Washington, D.C.	District of Columbia	WDVM-TV	25	
Boca Raton	Florida	WBEC-TV	63	‡
Gainesville	Florida	WGFL	28.2	
Jacksonville	Florida	WJXT	4	
Miami–Fort Lauderdale	Florida	WMDF-LD	3	
Miami–Fort Lauderdale	Florida	WPLG	10	
Miami–Fort Lauderdale	Florida	WSFL-TV	39	
Orlando	Florida	WACX	55	†
Orlando	Florida	WDSC-TV	15	‡
Orlando	Florida	WEFS	68	‡
Orlando	Florida	WRBW	65	
Orlando	Florida	WRDQ	27	
Panama City	Florida	WECP-LD	18.2	
Pensacola	Florida	WJTC	44	
Tallahassee	Florida	WFXU	57	
Tampa–St. Petersburg	Florida	WMOR-TV	32	
Tampa–St. Petersburg	Florida	WPDS-LD	14	‡
Tampa–St. Petersburg	Florida	WSNN-LD	39	
Tampa–St. Petersburg	Florida	WTOG	44	
Tampa–St. Petersburg	Florida	WXPX-TV	66	
West Palm Beach	Florida	WHDT	9	
West Palm Beach	Florida	WTCN-CD	43	
West Palm Beach	Florida	WTVX	34.3	
Albany	Georgia	WSWG	43.3	(Note: Rebroadcaster of WSST-TV.)
Albany	Georgia	WSST-TV	55	
Atlanta	Georgia	WANF	46	
Atlanta	Georgia	WATC-DT	57	†
Atlanta	Georgia	WATL	36	
Augusta	Georgia	WRDW-TV	12.2	
Honolulu	Hawaii	KALO	38	†
Honolulu	Hawaii	KBFD-DT	32	‡
Honolulu	Hawaii	KHII-TV	9	
Honolulu	Hawaii	KIKU	20	‡
Honolulu	Hawaii	KWHE	14	†
Boise	Idaho	KIVI-TV	6.2	
Twin Falls	Idaho	KSAW-LD	6.2	
Champaign–Springfield	Illinois	WCIX	49	
Chicago	Illinois	WCIU-TV	26	
Chicago	Illinois	WEDE-CD	34	†
Chicago	Illinois	WJYS	62	†
Chicago	Illinois	WMEU-CD	48	
Chicago	Illinois	WPWR-TV	50	
Peoria	Illinois	WHOI	19	
Rockford	Illinois	WTVO	17.2	
Fort Wayne	Indiana	WPTA	21.3	
Indianapolis	Indiana	WNDY-TV	23	
Kokomo	Indiana	WTTK	29	
South Bend	Indiana	WMYS-LD	69	
Vincennes	Indiana	WVUT	22	‡
Cedar Rapids	Iowa	KCRG-TV	9.2	
Davenport	Iowa	WQAD-TV	8.3	
Mason City	Iowa	KIMT	3.2	
Wichita	Kansas	KSAS-TV	24.2	
Lexington	Kentucky	WBON-LD	9	
Lexington	Kentucky	WTVQ-DT	36.2	
Louisville	Kentucky	WBKI	58.3	
Louisville	Kentucky	WBNA	21	†
Paducah	Kentucky	KBSI	22.2	
Paducah	Kentucky	WDKA	49	
Baton Rouge	Louisiana	KBTR-CD	36	
Baton Rouge	Louisiana	KZUP-CD	20	
Baton Rouge	Louisiana	WAFB	9.4	
Baton Rouge	Louisiana	WBXH-CD	39	
Lafayette	Louisiana	KADN-TV	15.3	
Lafayette	Louisiana	KAJN-CD	19	†
Monroe	Louisiana	KMCT-TV	39	†
New Orleans	Louisiana	KFOL-CD	30	†
New Orleans	Louisiana	WLAE-TV	32	‡
New Orleans	Louisiana	WUPL	54	
Shreveport	Louisiana	KSHV-TV	45	
Baltimore	Maryland	WBFF	45.2	
Boston	Massachusetts	WHDH	7	
Boston	Massachusetts	WSBK-TV	38	
Detroit	Michigan	WADL	38	
Detroit	Michigan	WMYD	20	
Flint	Michigan	WNEM-TV	5.2	
Grand Rapids	Michigan	WLLA	64	†
Grand Rapids	Michigan	WWMT	3.2	
Grand Rapids	Michigan	WXMI	17.2	
Grand Rapids	Michigan	WXSP-CD	15	
Lansing–Jackson	Michigan	WSYM-TV	47.2	
Marquette	Michigan	WJMN-TV	3.3	
Bemidji	Minnesota	KFTC	26.2	
Chisholm	Minnesota	KRII	11.3	
Minneapolis–Saint Paul	Minnesota	KSTC-TV	5.2	
Minneapolis–Saint Paul	Minnesota	WFTC	9.2	
Jackson	Mississippi	WJTV	12.2	
Jackson	Mississippi	WLOO	35	
Meridian	Mississippi	WTOK-TV	11.2	
Tupelo	Mississippi	WCBI-TV	4.2	
Jefferson City	Missouri	KMIZ	17.3	
Kansas City	Missouri	KMCI-TV	38	
Kansas City	Missouri	KSMO-TV	62	
Springfield	Missouri	KOZL-TV	27	
St. Louis	Missouri	KDNL-TV	30	
Billings	Montana	KTVQ	2.2	
Butte	Montana	KXLF-TV	4.2	
Great Falls	Montana	KRTV	3.2	
Helena	Montana	KTVH-DT	12.2	
Kalispell	Montana	KAJJ-CD	18.2	
Missoula	Montana	KPAX-TV	8.2	
North Platte	Nebraska	KNPL-LD	25.2	
Las Vegas	Nevada	KMCC	34	
Las Vegas	Nevada	KVCW	33.2	
Reno	Nevada	KNSN-TV	21	
Albuquerque	New Mexico	KASY-TV	50	
Albuquerque	New Mexico	KCHF	11	†
Albuquerque	New Mexico	KRQE	13.2	
Roswel	New Mexico	KBIM-TV	10.2	
Albany	New York	WNYA	51	
Binghamton	New York	WICZ-TV	40.2	
Buffalo	New York	WBBZ-TV	67	
Buffalo	New York	WNYO-TV	49	
Elmira	New York	WJKP-LD	39	
Elmira	New York	WYDC	48.2	
New York City	New York	WWOR-TV	9	
New York City	New York	WNYE-TV	25	‡
Riverhead	New York	WLNY-TV	55	
Rochester	New York	WBGT-CD	46	
Syracuse	New York	WSYT	43	
Utica	New York	WPNY-LD	11	
Utica	New York	WUTR	20.2	
Charlotte	North Carolina	WAXN-TV	64	
Charlotte	North Carolina	WCCB	18	
Greensboro	North Carolina	WMYV	48	
Greenville	North Carolina	WITN-TV	7.2	
Raleigh–Durham–Fayetteville	North Carolina	WNGT-CD	34	
Raleigh–Durham–Fayetteville	North Carolina	WAUG-LD	8	
Raleigh–Durham–Fayetteville	North Carolina	WRDC	28	
Reidsville	North Carolina	WGSR-LD	19	
Wilmington	North Carolina	WILM-LD	10	
Bismarck	North Dakota	KBMY	17.3	
Fargo	North Dakota	WDAY-TV	6.3	
Grand Forks	North Dakota	WDAZ-TV	8.3	
Minot	North Dakota	KMCY	14.3	
Cincinnati	Ohio	WSTR-TV	64	
Cleveland	Ohio	WUAB	43	
Lima	Ohio	WLMA	44	†
Mansfield	Ohio	WMFD-TV	68	
Sandusky	Ohio	WGGN-TV	52	†
Toledo	Ohio	WLMB	40	†
Youngstown	Ohio	WYTV	33.2	
Youngstown	Ohio	WYFX-LD	32.2	
Oklahoma City	Oklahoma	KOCB	34	
Oklahoma City	Oklahoma	KSBI	52	
Tulsa	Oklahoma	KMYT-TV	41	
Tulsa	Oklahoma	KRSU-TV	35	‡
Bend	Oregon	KUBN-LD	50	
Eugene	Oregon	KEVU-CD	23	
Eugene	Oregon	KLSR-TV	34.2	
Medford	Oregon	KFBI-LD	48	
Portland	Oregon	KPDX	49	
Portland	Oregon	KUNP	16	
Allentown–Bethlehem–Easton	Pennsylvania	WFMZ-TV	69	
Harrisburg	Pennsylvania	WLYH	49	†
Harrisburg	Pennsylvania	WHP-TV	21.2	
Philadelphia	Pennsylvania	WPHL-TV	17.2	
Philadelphia	Pennsylvania	WPSG	57	
Pittsburgh	Pennsylvania	WPKD-TV	19	
Scranton	Pennsylvania	WQMY	53	
Scranton	Pennsylvania	WOLF-TV	56.3	
State College	Pennsylvania	WHVL-LD	29	
Mayagüez	Puerto Rico	WIPM-TV	3	‡ (Note: Translator of WIPR-TV.)
Ponce	Puerto Rico	WSTE-DT	7.2	‡
Ponce	Puerto Rico	WTIN-TV	14	(Note: Translator for WAPA-TV.)
San Juan	Puerto Rico	WAPA-TV	27	
San Juan	Puerto Rico	WIPR-TV	6	‡
Providence	Rhode Island	WPRI-TV	12.2	
Charleston	South Carolina	WCIV	36	
Columbia	South Carolina	WKTC	63	
Greenville	South Carolina	WGGS-TV	16	†
Greenville	South Carolina	WLOS	13.2	
Rapid City	South Dakota	KWBH-LD	27	
Rapid City	South Dakota	KNBN	21.2	
Sioux Falls	South Dakota	KCPO-LD	26	
Sioux Falls	South Dakota	KELO-TV	11.2	
Chattanooga	Tennessee	WFLI-TV	53.2	
Knoxville	Tennessee	WKNX-TV	7	
Knoxville	Tennessee	WVLT-TV	8.2	
Nashville	Tennessee	WUXP-TV	30	
Nashville	Tennessee	WNPX-TV	28	
Abilene	Texas	KXVA	15.2	
Amarillo	Texas	KAMR-TV	4.2	
Amarillo	Texas	KCPN-LD	33	
Amarillo	Texas	KFDA-TV	10.2	
Austin	Texas	KBVO	14	
Austin	Texas	KBVO-CD	14	(Note: Repeater of KBVO.)
Beaumont–Port Arthur	Texas	KBMT-LD	12.5	
Bryan	Texas	KYLE-TV	28	
Corpus Christi	Texas	K22JA-D	47.2	
Corpus Christi	Texas	KSCC	38.3	
Dallas–Fort Worth	Texas	KDFI	27	
Dallas–Fort Worth	Texas	KFAA-TV	29	
Dallas–Fort Worth	Texas	KTXA	21	
El Paso	Texas	KSCE	38	†
Harlingen	Texas	KGBT-TV	4.2	
Houston	Texas	KCVH-LD	6	†
Houston	Texas	KTXH	20	
Longview	Texas	KFXK-TV	51.2	
Lubbock	Texas	KMYL-LD	14	
Lubbock	Texas	KLCW-TV	22.2	(Note: Repeater of KMYL-LD.)
Midland–Odessa	Texas	KWWT	30	
San Angelo	Texas	KIDY	6.2	
San Antonio	Texas	KCWX	2	
Sherman	Texas	KXII	12.2	
Tyler	Texas	KTPN-LD	48	
Waco	Texas	KWKT-TV	44.2	
Wichita Falls	Texas	KJBO-LD	35	
Wichita Falls	Texas	KFDX-TV	3.2	
Salt Lake City	Utah	KJZZ-TV	14	
Salt Lake City	Utah	KMYU	12	
Salt Lake City	Utah	KUPX-TV	16	
Salt Lake City	Utah	KUTV	2.2	
Christiansted	United States Virgin Islands	WSVI	8	
Charlotte Amalie, U.S. Virgin Islands	United States Virgin Islands	WZVI	21	(Note: Translator of WSVI.)
Burlington	Vermont	WYCI	40	
Burlington	Vermont	W26FR-D	40	(Note: Translator of WYCI.)
Danville–Martinsville	Virginia	WMDV-LD	23	
Norfolk	Virginia	WGNT	27	
Norfolk	Virginia	WSKY-TV	4	
Norfolk	Virginia	WTVZ-TV	33	
Roanoke	Virginia	WZBJ	24	
Roanoke	Virginia	WZBJ-CD	24	(Note: Translator of WZBJ.)
Seattle–Tacoma	Washington	KONG	16	
Seattle–Tacoma	Washington	KSTW	11	
Seattle–Tacoma	Washington	KZJO	22	
Wheeling	West Virginia	WTRF-TV	7.2	
Eau Claire	Wisconsin	WKBT-DT	8.2	
Green Bay	Wisconsin	WACY-TV	32	
Madison	Wisconsin	WISC-TV	3.2	
Milwaukee	Wisconsin	WMLW-TV	49	
Milwaukee	Wisconsin	WVTV	24	
Wausau	Wisconsin	WSAW-TV	7.2	

== See also ==
- Broadcast syndication
- Independent station
- MyNetworkTV
