= KWBN =

Television station in Honolulu

- Honolulu, Hawaii; United States
- Channels: Digital: 26 (UHF); Virtual: 44

Programming
- Affiliations: 44.1: Daystar; 44.2: Daystar Español; 44.3: Daystar Reflections

Ownership
- Owner: Word of God Fellowship; (Ho'ona'auao Community Television, Inc.)

History
- First air date: 1999
- Former channel numbers: Analog: 44 (UHF, 1999–2009); Digital: 43 (UHF, until 2018)

Technical information
- Licensing authority: FCC
- Facility ID: 27425
- ERP: 4.58 kW
- HAAT: 577 m (1,893 ft)
- Transmitter coordinates: 21°23′33.6″N 158°5′48.1″W

Links
- Public license information: Public file; LMS
- Website: http://www.daystar.com/

KWBN (channel 44) is a religious television station in Honolulu, Hawaii, United States, airing programming from the Daystar Television Network. The station is owned by Ho'ona'auao Community Television, a subsidiary of Daystar parent company Word of God Fellowship. KWBN's transmitter is located in Akupu, Hawaii.

KWBN, which signed on the air in 1999, is one of six religious stations serving the Honolulu television market, with KWHE, KAAH-TV, KALO, KKAI and KUPU being the other five.

KWBN's allocation channel, like KALO and PBS member station KHET, is reserved for non-commercial use, and as such, must rely on paid religious programs, educational fare, and viewer donations for support.

== Technical information ==
=== Subchannels ===
The station's signal is multiplexed:

Subchannels of KWBN
Subchannel	Res.	Short name	Programming
44.1	1080i	KWBN-DT	Daystar
44.2	720p	KWBN-ES	Daystar Español
44.3	480i	KWBN-SD	Daystar Reflections

=== Analog-to-digital conversion ===
In 2009, KWBN left channel 44 and moved to channel 43 when the analog-to-digital conversion was completed.

On April 13, 2017, the FCC announced that KWBN would relocate to RF channel 26 by April 12, 2019, as a result of the broadcast incentive auction. The move was completed in December 2018.
