= KMGT =

KMGT may refer to:

- KMGT (FM), a radio station (90.3 FM) licensed to serve Circle, Montana, United States
- KUPU, a television station (channel 15, virtual 56) licensed to serve Waimanalo, Hawaii, United States, which held the call sign KMGT from 2000 to 2006
