= KALO =

Television station in Honolulu

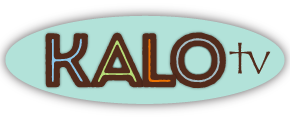
- Honolulu, Hawaii; United States
- Channels: Digital: 18 (UHF); Virtual: 38
- Branding: KALO 38

Programming
- Affiliations: 38.1: Religious independent

Ownership
- Owner: KALO TV, Inc.

History
- First air date: July 9, 1999
- Former call signs: KAIE (1999–2000)
- Former channel numbers: Analog: 38 (UHF, 1999–2009); Digital: 38 (UHF, 2009–2019); Translator: KAUI-LP 51 (UHF) Wailuku
- Call sign meaning: "Kalo" means taro in Hawaiian

Technical information
- Licensing authority: FCC
- Facility ID: 51241
- ERP: 103 kW
- HAAT: 688 m (2,257 ft)
- Transmitter coordinates: 21°24′10.8″N 158°5′52.2″W

Links
- Public license information: Public file; LMS
- Website: kalotv.com

KALO (channel 38) is an independent religious television station in Honolulu, Hawaii, United States. Owned by KALO TV, Inc., the station maintains studios on Waiakamilo Road in Honolulu, and its transmitter is located in Akupu, Hawaii.

KALO, which signed on the air July 9, 1999, is one of six stations in Honolulu that air religious programming, the other five being KWHE, KAAH-TV, KWBN, KKAI and KUPU. KALO's allocation channel, like that of KWBN and PBS outlet KHET, is reserved for non-commercial educational use, and as such, the station depends on viewer donations for support.

== Technical information ==
=== Subchannel ===
Subchannel of KALO
Subchannel	Res.	Short name	Programming
38.1	1080i	KALO HD	Main KALO programming

=== Analog-to-digital conversion ===
On January 15, 2009, KALO became channel 38 digital when the digital transition was completed.

On April 13, 2017, the FCC announced that KALO was relocated to RF channel 18 on June 21, 2019 as a result of the broadcast incentive auction.
