= KWHD =

KWHD may refer to:

- KEKE (TV), a television station (channel 23, virtual 14) licensed to Hilo, Hawaii, United States, which held the call sign KWHD from 2010 to 2021
- KETD, a television station (channel 46/PSIP 53) licensed to Castle Rock, Colorado, United States, which used the call sign KWHD from 1990 until 2010
