= ʻŌiwi TV =

Honolulu-based media channel

‘Ōiwi TV is a Honolulu-based media channel focusing on Hawaiian language and culture. The channel was started in 2007. The three founders were Keoni Lee, Nāʻālehu Anthony and Amy Kalili.

The channel aims to produce content from the Native Hawaiian perspective. This content consist of documentaries, news and other multimedia. ‘Ōiwi TV also collaborates with other organisations with similar aims such as Kamehameha Schools, OHA and Lili‘uokalani Trust.

As of September 2022 ‘Ōiwi TV has over 900 videos in Hawaiian and over 1200 videos in total.
