= Liliʻuokalani Trust =

Private foundation in Hawai'i, United States

Lili'uokalani Trust
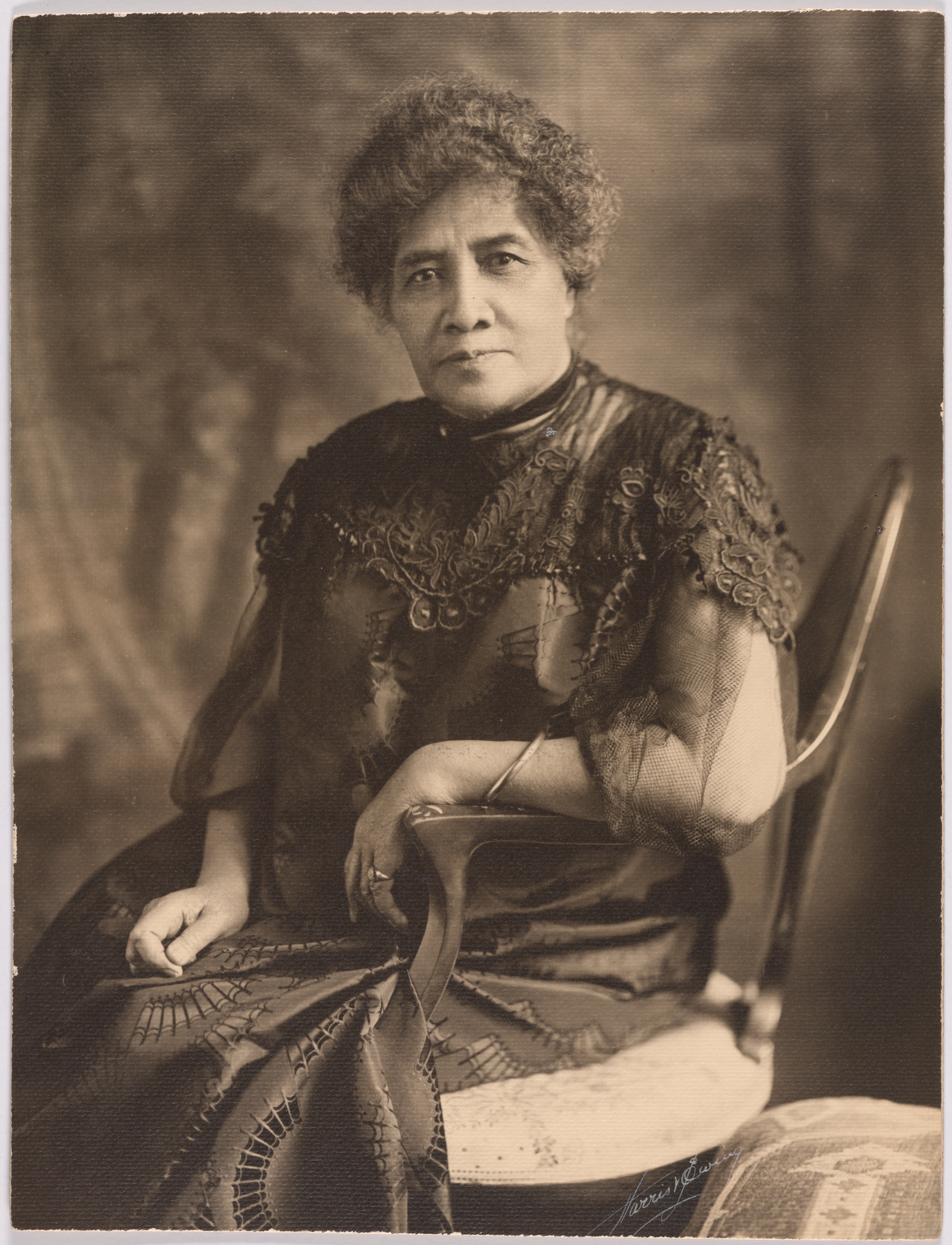
- Queen Liliʻuokalani in 1908
- Founded: 1909
- Founder: Queen Liliʻuokalani (a.k.a. Lydia Kamakaʻeha)
- Type: Non-profit Organization
- Legal status: 501(c)(3)
- Purpose: Provide for Orphaned and Destitute Children in the Hawaiian Islands
- Headquarters: Honolulu, Hawaiʻi
- Region served: Hawaiʻi
- CEO, Chief Executive Officer: Dawn Harflinger
- Board Chair: Dr. Claire Asam
- Board of Trustees: Robert H. Ozaki, Claire L. Asam and Mahina E. Hugo
- Employees: 51-200
- Website: https://onipaa.org

The Lili'uokalani Trust is a private operating foundation located in Hawaiʻi. It executes the Deed of Trust of Hawaiʻi's last ruling monarch, Liliʻuokalani, to provide for orphaned and destitute children, with preference given to native Hawaiian children.

== History ==
Liliʻuokalani executed a Deed of Trust in 1909, establishing the foundation for the Trust that bears her name.

The former monarch was passionate about the children of Hawaiʻi and "was active in the organization of schools for Hawaiian youth". In her will, she gave her estate over to provide native Hawaiian orphaned children (later changed to destitute children). Hence, Lili'uokalani aimed to address the challenges of child welfare post-European Colonization in Hawai'i. The Liliʻuokalani Trust was created to reflect welfare programs that were effective in other countries post Industrialization.

The Deed of Trust, executed by Queen Liliʻuokalani states that “all the property of the Trust Estate, both principal and income … shall be used by the Trustees for the benefit of orphan and other destitute children in the Hawaiian Islands, the preference given to Hawaiian children of pure or part-aboriginal blood.”

Since its establishment, the Trust has been focused on providing social services for vulnerable children. By 1953, the Trust was one of the three voluntary casework agencies in Hawaiʻi; the others being Children and Family Services and Catholic Social Services".

The first elected woman to the board of the trust and chairperson was Clorinda Low Lucas. Lucas cited her involvement with the Trust as the "most gratifying" of all her community projects. Lucas was integral in creating foster care and adoption as a means of caring for destitute children, as opposed to then-standard practices of sending children to orphanages. She worked with her son-in-law, Myron B. Thompson, who led the development of a foster care and adoption program for the trust.

== Organization Today ==
The Liliʻuokalani Trust funds its programs through revenue from its approximately 6,200 acres of Hawaiʻi real estate, as well as its investment portfolio. The Trust assists thousands of children and their families every year, and helps many more indirectly, through partnerships with other child-serving organizations. Today, the Trust is a "model for culturally appropriate interventions and culturally based programming" for native Hawaiian children. As part of its systems-level approach to caring for Native Hawaiian children, the Trust invests in programs to address issues in the juvenile justice and foster care systems.

In 2020, it was estimated that the Trust was "worth between $800 million and $900 million" (USD).

The current CEO is Dawn Harflinger, who succeeded Robert H. Ozaki, in 2021.

== Beliefs ==
Liliʻuokalani Trust believes in:

- Aloha (compassion, empathy, kindness)
- ‘Imi Na‘auao (seeking knowledge)
- Kuleana (responsible, accountable)
- Po‘okela (excellence)
- Pono (right time, place, reason, people, tools)
- Wiwo‘ole (courageous, brave, fearless)

The Mission of the Trust, outlined in their website; "Liliʻuokalani Trust provides opportunities for Hawaiian children to realize their greatest potential" and allow them to "liv[e] healthy, joyful, and prosperous lives, while contributing positively to their families, communities, and the world.".

== Services and Programs ==
Liliʻuokalani Trust's services and programs focus on three areas: Early Childhood (ages 0–5), Youth Development (ages 6–18), and Opportunity Youth (ages 16–26). Undergirding these activities is the Social Services Team, who provides a variety of clinically and culturally grounded supports including grief and loss counseling, and family strengthening and reunification programs for children of all ages and their families. Key initiatives include Lydia's House, an Opportunity Youth center in urban Honolulu for young adults aging out of foster and other systems care.

The Trust also provides community assistance during major crises including the Kīlauea eruptions and COVID-19. To support impacted communities, LT partnered with Ham's Produce and Seafood, which allowed for over 285 food distributions.

The Trust also employs a Research, Evaluation, and Strategy team that aims to create and disseminate new and radical knowledge about Native Hawaiian wellbeing. The Trust communicated with over 300 stakeholders to spread awareness on breaking the cycle of poverty for Native Hawaiians, and developed a Systems Map which focuses on the following areas: "Heal Trauma," "Strengthen 'Ohana," "Kūpuna and Keiki", and "Strengthen Collective". The Trust has addressed food security in Hawai'i and "co-hosted a panel of experts" to identify solutions to this issue.

== Collaborations ==
LT collaborates with other child-serving organizations including the Department of Human Services, Child Welfare Services, and Family Programs Hawaiʻi. One example of its partnership efforts is the Ka Pili ʻOhana (KPO) program with Child and Family Service.

In 2016, the Trust contributed $50,000 to the University of Hawaiʻi to support the creation of a professorship at the University of Hawaiʻi at Mānoa Myron B. Thompson School of Social Work, with the goal of creating a program based on Native Hawaiian culture and the training of health professionals . Working with the Myron B. Thompson School of Social Work, the Trust and school students produced a report, "Changing the Story: Strategies for Guiding Native Hawaiian Youth to Success".

The Trust collaborates with national-level partners, including the Aspen State Institute. The two organizations delivered a report on the Hawaiʻi youth sports landscape titled "State of Play: Hawaiʻi".

Working with local parks and nature reserves, the Liliʻuokalani Trust volunteers in clean-ups and other preservation activities. An example is the Blue Zones Project and Puʻuhonua o Honaunau National Historical Park. In a similar project, the Trust worked with Blue Zones Project and the Lions Club to assist with cleaning up rubbish along the Queen Kaʻahumanu Highway.

== Notable Awards ==
The Liliʻuokalani Trust was awarded the "Kudos" 2021 Best Culture Award

It is ranked by Hawaiʻi Business magazine as 115 out of the state's Top 250 Companies.
