= KXHI =

Television station in Hilo, Hawaii

- Hilo, Hawaii; United States
- Channels: Digital: 23 (UHF); Virtual: 14

Programming
- Affiliations: 14.1: Spanish independent

Ownership
- Owner: RED-TV, LLC

History
- First air date: October 1, 1989
- Former call signs: KWHH (1989–2010); KWHD (2010–2021); KEKE (2021–2024)
- Former channel numbers: Analog: 14 (UHF, 1989–2009)
- Former affiliations: As satellite of KWHE: Independent (1989–1995); The WB (1995–1998); LeSEA (1998–2018); Religious independent (2018–2021)

Technical information
- Licensing authority: FCC
- Facility ID: 37103
- ERP: 14.9 kW
- HAAT: 33 m (108 ft)
- Transmitter coordinates: 19°42′49″N 155°8′3″W

Links
- Public license information: Public file; LMS

KXHI (channel 14) is a Spanish-language independent television station in Hilo, Hawaii, United States, owned by RED-TV, LLC. The station's transmitter is located west of Hilo.

== History ==
Channel 14 in Hilo was started as KWHH, a satellite of LeSEA Broadcasting's KWHE on Oʻahu, on October 1, 1989; it retained that status for more than 30 years.

It became KWHD in 2010, warehousing a call sign that was used on channel 53 near Denver, which LeSEA had just sold.

On August 12, 2020, Family Broadcasting Corporation (the former LeSEA) announced it would sell KWHD to Halepule Television for $100,000; the sale was completed on September 25. The call letters changed to KEKE on November 8, 2021.

On November 28, 2024, the call letters were changed to KXHI. On December 12, 2024, Halepule Television sold KXHI to RED-TV; the sale was consummated on December 26.

== Technical information ==
=== Subchannel ===
Subchannel of KXHI
Channel	Res.	Short name	Programming
14.1	480i		Main KXHI programming (4:3)

=== Analog-to-digital conversion ===
After Hawaii's switch to DTV on January 15, 2009 (five months earlier than the June 12 transition date for stations on the U.S. mainland), KWHH remained on its pre-transition UHF channel 23.
