= KHII-TV =

Television station in Honolulu

ATSC 3.0 station
- Honolulu, Hawaii; United States
- Channels: Digital: 22 (UHF); Virtual: 9
- Branding: KHII (general, pronounced as "K-Hi"); KHON 2 News (newscasts)

Programming
- Affiliations: 9.1: Independent with MyNetworkTV; 9.2: Rewind TV

Ownership
- Owner: Nexstar Media Group; (Nexstar Media Inc.)
- Sister stations: KHON-TV

History
- Founded: May 12, 1986
- First air date: February 7, 1988 (intellectual unit); December 1, 1952 (current broadcast facility)
- Former call signs: KFVE (1988–2019)
- Former channel numbers: Analog: 5 (VHF, 1988–2009); Digital: 23 (UHF, until October 2009); Virtual: 5 (until 2009)
- Former affiliations: Independent (1988–1995); UPN (1995–2002); The WB (secondary 1998–2002, primary 2002–2006)
- Call sign meaning: Hawaii

Technical information
- Licensing authority: FCC
- Facility ID: 36917
- ERP: 40 kW
- HAAT: 629 m (2,064 ft)
- Transmitter coordinates: 21°23′52″N 158°6′0″W

Links
- Public license information: Public file; LMS
- Website: www.khon2.com/khii

KHII-TV (channel 9) is an independent television station in Honolulu, Hawaii, United States, serving the Hawaiian Islands and also having a secondary affiliation with MyNetworkTV. It is owned by Nexstar Media Group alongside dual Fox/CW affiliate KHON-TV (channel 2). The two stations share studios at the Hawaiki Tower on Piikoi Street in downtown Honolulu; KHII's main transmitter is located in Akupu, Hawaii.

== History ==
=== Early history ===
KHII signed on the air on February 7, 1988, as KFVE, broadcasting on channel 5, as the final VHF station in the market. Originally, KFVE focused on low-budget programming such as Hawaii Five-O repeats. Later under the moniker "Hawaii is Watching us Grow", it focused on movies and syndicated fare, and by 1990 acquired programs from KMGT (channel 26, now KAAH) before its format switch to religious programming. As a small-time independent station, it had to rely on low-budget programming and Japanese television dramas (most of which were later carried on independent station KIKU, channel 20) through much of its early existence. That all changed in 1993 when another local station, KHNL (then a Fox affiliate owned by the Providence Journal Company), took over management of KFVE through a local marketing agreement (LMA). KFVE then merged its operations into KHNL's facility. It was the first such local market sharing organization in the country. After KHNL took over oversight of the station in the mid-1990s, coverage of University of Hawaiʻi athletics moved over to KFVE, which rebranded as "The Home Team".

=== UPN and WB affiliations ===
On January 16, 1995, KFVE became a charter affiliate of UPN under the brand name "K-5 UPN Hawaii". On December 28, 1998, the station began carrying programming from The WB as a secondary affiliation. Previously, The WB was carried throughout Hawaii on KWHE (channel 14). KFVE was acquired outright by Raycom Media on December 31, 1999. Raycom had purchased KHNL and the LMA with KFVE from Belo Corporation two months earlier, but acquired KFVE's license as well after the FCC began permitting duopolies between television stations.

On September 2, 2002, KFVE dropped its affiliation with UPN and became a primary WB affiliate. The station rebranded itself as "K-5, The Home Team: Hawaii's WB", with the "Hawaii's WB" branding being used primarily during promotional advertisements for WB programming. In the Honolulu market, UPN programming moved to KHON-TV (channel 2) and KGMB (then on channel 9), which both carried secondary affiliations with the network from September 2002 to October 2004.

=== MyNetworkTV affiliation ===
On March 7, 2006, Raycom Media announced that KFVE would affiliate with MyNetworkTV as part of a group deal involving many of Raycom-owned affiliates of The WB and UPN (whose consolidation and shutdowns the following September resulted in the creation of The CW Television Network, which would affiliate in Hawaii with a digital subchannel of KHON-TV). KFVE officially joined MyNetworkTV on September 5, 2006, and did not air The WB's final two weeks of prime time programming (though it continued to air WB daytime and Saturday morning programming until the end of the network's existence).

On January 15, 2009, DirecTV transferred KFVE from analog to its digital and high definition signals due to the analog shutdown. The HD feed of KFVE was pulled off DirecTV on January 16 for unknown reasons. A standard definition digital feed of the station was restored on the satellite provider on January 17. On February 29, 2012, KFVE's HD feed was restored on DirecTV.

On August 18, 2009, Raycom Media announced that it would enter into a shared services agreement with MCG Capital Corporation (owner of CBS affiliate KGMB), in which the operations of that station, KFVE and KHNL would be combined. The SSA also moved KFVE and its programming from virtual channel 5 to channel 9 under MCG ownership, while KGMB moved from 9 to 5 and fell under Raycom's ownership. The FCC only recognizes ownership of facility IDs and not station call signs or intellectual property, allowing MCG Capital to gain ownership of KFVE and Raycom ownership of KGMB during the swap. The overall viewership of KFVE, while on channel 5, fell outside the criteria (which restricts ownership of two stations in the same market to one of the four highest-rated stations and one not among the top four) that would have otherwise barred a duopoly between KHNL and KGMB if facility IDs were traded as well. The channel swap took effect with the SSA on October 26, 2009, as KFVE moved from 5 to 9 and changed its on-air branding from "K-5" to simply "KFVE". As a result, KFVE now operates under KGMB's license. The two stations also swapped outer-island satellites. On November 20, 2013, MCG Capital filed to sell KFVE and its satellites to American Spirit Media, a company owned by Thomas B. Henson and a shared services duopoly partner with Raycom in several other markets, for $22 million.

=== Sale to Nexstar ===
On June 25, 2018, Atlanta-based Gray Television announced it had reached an agreement with Raycom to merge their respective broadcasting assets (consisting of Raycom's 63 existing owned-and/or-operated television stations, including KHNL and KGMB, and Gray's 93 television stations) under the former's corporate umbrella in a cash-and-stock merger transaction valued at $3.6 billion. Because Raycom operated three stations in the Honolulu market, the companies were required to sell either KHNL, KGMB or KFVE to another station owner in order to comply with FCC ownership rules.

On November 1, 2018, Irving, Texas–based Nexstar Media Group—which has owned Fox affiliate KHON-TV since January 2017—announced that it would acquire KFVE and the licenses of satellites KGMD-TV and KGMV from American Spirit Media for $6.5 million. Nexstar concurrently assumed the station's operations through a time brokerage agreement that took effect the day the transaction paperwork was filed with the FCC, under which Raycom forwarded the rights to certain managerial services involving KFVE—not counting certain other services to which Raycom would retain stewardship under the TBA—on a transitional basis. Under the deal, Nexstar also intended to integrate KFVE's operations into KHON's studio facilities at the Haiwaiki Tower on Piikoi and Waimanu Streets. However, Raycom retained the rights to the KFVE intellectual unit (call letters, syndicated and local programming), which were shifted to a digital subchannel of KGMB as was KFVE-DT2's Bounce TV affiliation (which was moved to KGMB-DT4); the KFVE calls were also retained by Raycom for branding continuity. As such, Nexstar assigned new call letters to the channel 9 license as well as acquired programming to replace that being maintained by Raycom post-acquisition (which included shifting the programming on KHON's CW-affiliated DT2 feed to the KFVE license, and the retention of the MyNetworkTV affiliation, which Raycom did not include in the KFVE intellectual property transaction.)

The sale of KFVE to Nexstar was approved by the FCC on December 17; the Gray-Raycom merger was approved three days later.

On January 17, 2019, Nexstar announced that it would relaunch the station as KHII-TV. The station would retain its MyNetworkTV affiliation and plans to continue its focus on bringing local programming to Hawaii. The rebranding and call sign change took place concurrent with the sale's completion on January 28. At the same time, KFVE's intellectual unit and syndicated programming, along with its Hawaii-centric specials, moved to the second digital subchannel of KHNL-DT2 (channel 13.2), and changed its cable channel position from Charter Spectrum 5/1005 to 22/1022. The HD feed of "K5" was temporarily exclusive to cable, because ever since its inception, KHNL-DT2 had been broadcast in 480i 4:3 standard definition. An equipment upgrade in early 2021 allowed for an upgrade of the subchannel to 720p 16:9 high definition; however, the KSIX-DT2 and KOGG-DT2 simulcasts of "K5" continue to be aired in standard definition.

== Programming ==
KHII clears all MyNetworkTV programming, except for the occasional preemption in order to broadcast local sports or other special events. As the station (as KFVE) once did with UPN and WB programs, KHII will delay MyNetworkTV programming until the weekend in order to broadcast these sporting events. Because MyNetworkTV airs ten hours of programming per week, syndicated programming makes up a vast portion of KHII's weekday schedule, especially during the daytime. Until the 2009 channel swap, KFVE, unlike most affiliates, only used the MyNetworkTV logo to promote its programming in a similar way to WXSP-CA in Grand Rapids, Michigan, which uses the branding "The X" and a "MyNetworkTV WXSP" logo. KFVE's local logo was used at all other times such as when promoting sitcom repeats or news.

Movies are also a regular part of its weekend afternoon schedule; late night and early morning timeslots on KHII primarily feature infomercials. KHII was also home to the most complete and comprehensive college sports package in the country as the station showcased more than 100 University of Hawaiʻi sports events annually. Sports covered on KFVE included football, men's and women's volleyball, men's and women's basketball, baseball, softball, and women's soccer. KFVE (since 1994) and sister station KHNL (from 1984 to 1993) had been the home of University of Hawaiʻi sports in the islands for over two decades. KFVE broadcast home games in high definition beginning in August 2009 on pay-per-view, with Wahine volleyball, Warrior basketball and Warrior football televised in HD. Events that were not aired on pay-per-view were broadcast in standard definition.

KFVE broadcast its last University of Hawaiʻi sports event on May 15, 2011, with a baseball game against the San Jose State Spartans. In August 2011, Oceanic Cable began carrying University of Hawaiʻi sports evenings on a new regional sports network OC Sports Channel (which is carried on channel 12). In January 2012, KFVE broadcast two Pac-West Conference basketball games in HD, featuring Hawaii Pacific University as the home team in both contests.

KHII currently airs the MyNetworkTV prime time programming block from 8 to 10 p.m., instead of the usual scheduled time period of 7 to 9 p.m., which is reserved for local and syndicated programming (KHII airs a local newscast produced by KHON during the 7 p.m. hour).

In January 2015, KFVE added Korean dramas to its weekend lineup, airing Sundays from 2 to 5 p.m. They became the second station in Hawaii to feature Korean programming, after KBFD.

=== Newscasts ===
==== KFVE ====
On April 17, 1995, KHNL began producing a prime time newscast at 9 p.m. that was simulcast on KFVE; this newscast, by then a standalone program as KHNL dropped its 9 p.m. newscast after switching from Fox to NBC, was dropped on August 3, 1997. On October 18, 2004, KHNL began producing a prime time newscast for KFVE once more, this time airing exclusively on the station; KFVE was the only station in the market to carry its late evening newscast at 9 p.m. as Fox affiliate KHON-TV airs its late newscast at 10 p.m. However, KHON-TV added a 9 p.m. newscast in 2014. KHNL's production of KFVE's newscasts expanded on January 7, 2008, when the then-channel 5 began carrying an early evening newscast at 6:30 p.m. Later that year on December 22, KHNL began broadcasting its local newscasts in high definition; KFVE's newscasts were included in the upgrade.

The shared services agreement resulted in the termination of all but four members of KHNL's on-air staff and all of the technicians for KHNL's morning show when its newsroom merged with KGMB and the two began simulcasting newscasts on October 26, 2009. KFVE maintained its 6:30 and 9 p.m. newscasts that it had prior to the formation of the SSA between KHNL and KGMB; however, the SSA resulted in the addition of an hour-long weekday morning newscast from 8 to 9 a.m., which aired in that timeslot and for only one hour due to KGMB continuing to run an hour-long extension of Hawaii News Now: Sunrise from 7 to 8 a.m. There were no simulcasts of any newscasts from either of its two major network sister stations.

==== KHII-TV ====
As part of the switch to KHII, on January 28, 2019, the station began airing a simulcast of KHON's morning newscast Wake Up 2day and an hour-long weeknight 7 p.m. newscast produced by KHON. Five days later, on February 2, KHII began simulcasting KHON's 6 p.m. and 10 p.m. weekend newscasts.

==== Notable current on-air staff ====
- Augie T.

== Technical information ==
=== Subchannels ===
Subchannels provided by KHII-TV (ATSC 1.0)
Subchannel	Res.	Short name	Programming	ATSC 1.0 host
9.1	720p	KHII-DT	Main KHII-TV programming	KGMB
9.2	480i	Rewind	Rewind TV	KIKU

=== ATSC 3.0 lighthouse service ===
Subchannels of KHII-TV (ATSC 3.0)
Subchannel	Short name	Programming
2.1	KHON-DT	Fox (KHON-TV)
4.1	KITV-HD	ABC (KITV)
5.1	KGMB	CBS (KGMB)
9.1	KHII DT	Independent with MyNetworkTV
13.1	KHNL-DT	NBC (KHNL)
13.2	K5	"K5" (Independent)

Subchannel broadcast with digital rights management

=== Analog-to-digital conversion ===
KHII-TV (as KFVE) ended regular programming on its analog signal, over VHF channel 5, on January 15, 2009, the date on which full-power television stations in Hawaii transitioned from analog to digital broadcasts (almost five months earlier than the June 12 transition date for stations on the U.S. mainland). The station's digital signal remained on its pre-transition UHF channel 23, using virtual channel 5. Following the channel swap with KGMB, the station's digital channel switched to UHF channel 22 and its virtual channel to 9.

== Satellite stations ==
As with other major television stations in Hawaii, KHII operates satellite stations across the Hawaiian Islands to rebroadcast the station's programming outside of metropolitan Honolulu. The stations formerly served as KGMB satellite stations until the 2009 KGMB/KFVE facility swap, which resulted in both stations becoming satellites of KFVE. The 2019 purchase by Nexstar retained these stations as KHII satellites.

Station	City of license	Channel RF / VC	First air date	ERP	HAAT	Facility ID	Transmitter coordinates	Transmitter location	Public license information
KGMD-TV (Note: KGMD-TV used the call sign KHBC-TV from 1955 to 1965 and was KPUA-TV from 1965 to 1976.)	Hilo	9 (VHF); 9	May 15, 1955	2 kW	31 m (102 ft)	36914	19°42′49″N 155°8′3″W	west of downtown	Public file LMS
KGMV (Note: KGMV used the calls KMAU from its 1955 sign-on (and added the -TV suffix in 1956) to 1976; it was KGME-TV from April 12 to September 28, 1976.)	Wailuku	24 (UHF); 9	April 24, 1955	77 kW	755 m (2,477 ft)	36920	20°39′25.5″N 156°21′35.8″W	summit of Haleakala	Public file LMS
