= KSCE =

Television station in El Paso, Texas

- El Paso, Texas; Las Cruces, New Mexico; United States
- City: El Paso, Texas
- Channels: Digital: 21 (UHF); Virtual: 38
- Branding: LIFE! Christian Broadcasting Network

Programming
- Affiliations: 38.1: Religious Independent; for others, see § Subchannels

Ownership
- Owner: Channel 38 Christian Television

History
- First air date: April 15, 1989
- Former channel numbers: Analog: 38 (UHF, 1989–2009); Digital: 39 (UHF, 2009–2019)
- Call sign meaning: St. Clement's Episcopal Parish School (original owners)

Technical information
- Licensing authority: FCC
- Facility ID: 10202
- ERP: 150 kW
- HAAT: 557 m (1,827 ft)
- Transmitter coordinates: 31°48′18.9″N 106°29′0.7″W

Links
- Public license information: Public file; LMS
- Website: lifechristian.tv

KSCE (channel 38) is a religious independent television station in El Paso, Texas, United States, owned by Channel 38 Christian Television. The station's studios are located on Wyoming Avenue (northwest of I-10) in central El Paso, and its transmitter is located atop the Franklin Mountains on the El Paso city limits.

== History ==
The station first signed on the air on April 15, 1989, operating on a non-commercial license. The call letters initially stood for "Saint Clements Episcopal", as the station was originally intended to be an outreach by Saint Clements Episcopal School in downtown El Paso. However, the school lost interest in television broadcasting and the station's controlling board of directors appointed Grace Rendall, a former director at KCIK-TV (channel 14, now KFOX-TV) as the station's manager before KSCE went on the air.

== Technical information ==
=== Subchannels ===
The station's signal is multiplexed:

Subchannels of KSCE
Channel	Res.	Short name	Programming
38.1	720p	LIFE	Main KSCE programming
38.2	1080i	VIDA	Spanish Religious
38.3	720p	ETTV	End Times TV
38.4	480i	KIDS	Kids and Youth Channel
38.5	480i	BIBLE	KSCE Bible

=== Analog-to-digital conversion ===
KSCE shut down its analog signal, over UHF channel 38, at 6 p.m. on June 12, 2009, the official date on which full-power television stations in the United States transitioned from analog to digital broadcasts under federal mandate. The station's digital signal remained on its pre-transition UHF channel 39, using virtual channel 38.

On April 20, 2010, KSCE filed a request for a special temporary authorization with the Federal Communications Commission (FCC) to resume operating an analog signal on UHF channel 38, to broadcast information regarding the dangers to those traveling across the U.S.–Mexico border as a result of the ongoing drug wars in Mexico, on justification that most people in need of the information are unable to afford digital televisions or digital converter boxes. On June 9, 2010, the FCC denied the station's request to restore its analog signal.
