= KWHE =

Television station in Honolulu

- Honolulu, Hawaii; United States
- Channels: Digital: 31 (UHF); Virtual: 14
- Branding: KWHE TV-14

Programming
- Affiliations: 14.1: Religious independent

Ownership
- Owner: Family Broadcasting Corporation

History
- First air date: August 23, 1986
- Former channel numbers: Analog: 14 (UHF, 1986–2009)
- Former affiliations: Independent (1986–1995); The WB (1995–1998); LeSEA (1998–2018)
- Call sign meaning: World Harvest Entertainment

Technical information
- Licensing authority: FCC
- Facility ID: 36846
- ERP: 20.1 kW
- HAAT: 5 m (16 ft)
- Transmitter coordinates: 21°18′38″N 157°51′33″W

Links
- Public license information: Public file; LMS
- Website: kwhetv14.com

KWHE (channel 14) is a religious independent television station in Honolulu, Hawaii, United States. The station is owned by the Family Broadcasting Corporation (formerly known as LeSEA Broadcasting), and maintains studios on Bishop Street in downtown Honolulu; its transmitter is located near Hawaii Pacific University.

KWHE's signal was formerly relayed on two satellite stations: KWHM (channel 21) in Wailuku and KWHD (channel 14) in Hilo. KWHM was sold in 2018 and is now KLEI, a satellite of Telemundo affiliate KFVE; KWHD was sold in 2020 and is now KEKE, a Spanish-language independent.

KWHE, along with KKAI, is one of only two religious stations in the Honolulu market (out of the six licensed to the area, which include KAAH-TV, KALO, KWBN and KUPU) that broadcasts secular programming; KWHE and KKAI, as well as KAAH and KUPU are licensed by the Federal Communications Commission (FCC) as commercial outlets.

== History ==
KWHE first signed on the air on August 23, 1986. From its sign-on, the station has offered a mix of secular general entertainment programs (mostly sitcoms, classic westerns, dramas, first-run syndicated fare and local sports events), with religious programming filling most of its schedule. The station would later expand its reach across the state with the launch of two satellite stations: KWHD signed on the air as KWHH on October 1, 1989, and KWHM signed on June 15, 1993.

On January 11, 1995, KWHE became the market's charter affiliate of The WB. As with other LeSEA-owned stations that affiliated with the network, KWHE only carried family-oriented programs from the network (such as Sister, Sister, The Parent 'Hood and 7th Heaven) as well as programming from Kids' WB when the network's children's programming block launched in September 1995; WB programs that contained sexual or violent content were not carried by the station due to content restrictions outlined by LeSEA for its stations. Partly due to these preemptions, KWHE lost its WB affiliation on December 28, 1998, when then-UPN affiliate KFVE (then on channel 5, now on channel 9) began carrying the network's entire programming schedule as a secondary affiliation.

KWHE, whose secular programming is usually family-friendly, was one of three stations in Honolulu that carried reruns of the crime drama Hawaii Five-O, which was filmed in Honolulu (the other two being KFVE and KGMB, originally on channel 9, now on channel 5, whose real-life news crew was often featured in many episodes). The show remains popular among viewers in the state and has continued to be syndicated since it ended its run on CBS in 1980. KWHE dropped the program in 2013, allowing KITV's digital sub channel MeTV Hawaii to clear the program (which was substituted with Mission: Impossible because of KWHE holding the rights) for Hawaii from the MeTV national schedule in 2014. Cozi TV, which airs a mix of classic television series from the 1950s through the 1980s, movies, and first-run lifestyle programming; was added to KWHE's digital subchannel (14.2) sometime around 2015; in 2017, it was replaced with Light TV (KUPU (channel 15) subsequently picked up the Cozi TV affiliation for the Hawaii market).

Since September 2017, KWHE began following the mandate of its sister stations in expanding its secular programming, adding more syndicated shows and off-network fare, starting at 12 noon Monday through Friday, all day on Saturdays, and from 12 noon to 7 p.m. and after 10 p.m. on Sundays. Religious programs are shown on Sunday through Friday mornings and from 7 to 10 p.m. on Sunday nights. Some of the secular shows are also seen on co-owned cable channel Family Entertainment Television.

== Technical information ==
=== Subchannel ===
Subchannel of KWHE
Subchannel	Res.	Short name	Programming
14.1	720p	KWHE-D1	Main KWHE programming

=== Analog-to-digital conversion ===
KWHE-TV ended regular programming on its analog signal, over UHF channel 14, on January 15, 2009, the date on which full-power television stations in Hawaii transitioned from analog to digital broadcasts (five months earlier than the June 12 transition date for stations on the U.S. mainland). The station's digital signal remained on its pre-transition UHF channel 31, using virtual channel 14.
