= KAAH-TV =

Television station in Honolulu

- Honolulu, Hawaii; United States
- Channels: Digital: 27 (UHF); Virtual: 26

Programming
- Affiliations: 26.1: TBN; for others, see § Subchannels

Ownership
- Owner: Trinity Broadcasting Network; (Trinity Broadcasting of Texas, Inc.)

History
- First air date: December 23, 1982
- Former call signs: KSHO-TV (1982–1986); KMGT (1986–1992); KOBN (1992–1996)
- Former channel numbers: Analog: 26 (UHF, 1982–2009)
- Former affiliations: Independent (1982–1990); HSN (1990–1996)
- Call sign meaning: All American TV Honolulu (former owners 1996–2003)

Technical information
- Licensing authority: FCC
- Facility ID: 3246
- ERP: 262 kW
- HAAT: 580 m (1,903 ft)
- Transmitter coordinates: 21°23′33.6″N 158°5′48.1″W

Links
- Public license information: Public file; LMS
- Website: www.tbn.org

KAAH-TV (channel 26) is a religious television station in Honolulu, Hawaii, United States, serving the Hawaiian Islands. The station is owned by the Trinity Broadcasting Network (TBN). KAAH-TV's transmitter is located on Palehua Ridge, north of Makakilo.

KAAH-TV formerly operated from a studio located on Smith Street in downtown Honolulu. That facility was one of several closed by TBN in 2019 following the Federal Communications Commission (FCC)'s abolition of the "Main Studio Rule", which required full-service television stations like KAAH-TV to maintain facilities in or near their communities of license.

== History ==
Mount Wilson FM Broadcasters applied for the channel 26 allocation in 1978 under the umbrella name Mauna Kea Broadcasting Company. KSHO signed on the air December 23, 1982, as Hawaii's first television station operating on the UHF band. Originally operating as a general entertainment independent station, the station offered a lineup of cartoons, sitcoms, drama series and movies during its early years. The station also aired Asian programming, primarily on weekends. In its early days, it carried business news programming from the Financial News Network, ethnic programming from the International Television Network, and carried ABC, CBS, and NBC programs that KITV (channel 4), KGMB (then on channel 9, now on channel 5) and KHON-TV (channel 2, now a Fox affiliate) chose to decline; programming from ABC's daytime lineup that was preempted by KITV was the most visible on KSHO's schedule.

At the same time that channel 26 launched, the station would get more competition when KIKU (channel 13, now KHNL), which had a part-English/part-Japanese programming schedule up until 1980 when it reverted to an English-language general entertainment format but retained some Asian language programs airing during the day, began adding more English-language programming and moved most of its Japanese programming to Sundays in an effort to be more competitive with KSHO. That would later be followed by the debuts of four additional stations that also added English-language first-run programming at the time: KHAI-TV (channel 20, now KIKU, no relation to the present-day KHNL that once bore those call letters) in 1983, KWHE (channel 14) and KBFD (channel 32) in 1986, and KFVE (then on channel 5, now on channel 9) in 1987. In between that period, channel 26 changed its call letters to KMGT in 1986. From 1986 to 1990, the station was branded as "K-Magic"—and even carried Los Angeles Lakers basketball games featuring Magic Johnson (who, in one promo for "K-Magic", said, "What a great name for a TV station!").

By 1989, KHNL and KFVE had taken the first- and second-tier syndicated movies and reruns meant for broadcast by independent stations, and KMGT was running a schedule of lower-budget programs. Knowing the station was a money-losing proposition, Mount Wilson FM Broadcasters sold KMGT to Oceania Broadcasting Network for $4.3 million. By 1990, KMGT began phasing out general entertainment programming in favor of carrying Home Shopping Network and religious programming from TBN as a dual affiliate; the station eventually changed its call letters to KOBN in 1992. The following year, the station was sold to All American Broadcasting (a company with no relationship whatsoever with the syndicator known as All American Television). In 1996, the station would switch call letters again to KAAH; it dropped HSN programming that year and began carrying TBN programming full-time. The Trinity Broadcasting Network would later buy the station outright in 2003; however, although it is owned by a non-profit broadcaster, KAAH-TV continues to be licensed by the Federal Communications Commission (FCC) as a commercial outlet (three other religious stations in the market—KKAI (channel 14), KWHE-TV (channel 14) and KUPU (channel 15)—are also licensed as commercial stations, although only the latter two carry secular programming).

KAAH operated KLEI in Kailua-Kona as a satellite station during the 1990s; that station is now a full-power standalone outlet serving as an affiliate of Telemundo. KAAH formerly operated a low-power repeater station, K34HC in Hilo. TBN took K34HC off-the-air on April 13, 2010, due to declining financial support, which has been attributed to the digital transition.

== Subchannels ==
The station's signal is multiplexed:

Subchannels of KAAH-TV
Subchannel	Res.	Short name	Programming
26.1	720p	TBN HD	TBN
26.2	720p	TVDEALS	Infomercials
26.3	480i	Inspire	TBN Inspire
26.4	480i	ONTV4U	OnTV4U (infomercials) (4:3)
26.5	480i	POSITIV	Positiv

TBN-owned full-power stations permanently ceased analog transmissions on April 16, 2009.

In February 2006, K34HC was granted a construction permit to begin converting operations to digital television prior to being taken off the air. Had it been completed, the station would have broadcast at an effective radiated power of 15 kW.
