= KPXO-TV =

Television station in Kaneohe, Hawaii

- Kaneohe–Honolulu, Hawaii; United States
- City: Kaneohe, Hawaii
- Channels: Digital: 32 (UHF); Virtual: 66

Programming
- Affiliations: 66.1: Ion Television; for others, see § Subchannels

Ownership
- Owner: Inyo Broadcast Holdings; (Inyo Broadcast Licenses LLC)

History
- First air date: August 31, 1998
- Former channel numbers: Analog: 66 (UHF, 1998–2009); Digital: 41 (UHF, until 2019)
- Call sign meaning: Pax TV Oahu

Technical information
- Licensing authority: FCC
- Facility ID: 77483
- ERP: DTS1: 0.68 kW; DTS2: 17 kW
- HAAT: DTS1: 80.9 m (265 ft); DTS2: 713 m (2,339 ft)
- Transmitter coordinates: DTS1: 21°25′20.5″N 157°45′25.1″W; DTS2: 21°24′11.8″N 158°5′52.8″W

Links
- Public license information: Public file; LMS
- Website: iontelevision.com

KPXO-TV (channel 66) is a television station licensed to Kaneohe, Hawaii, United States, serving the Hawaiian Islands as an affiliate of Ion Television. Owned by Inyo Broadcast Holdings, KPXO-TV maintains offices on Waimanu Street in Honolulu. It broadcasts from a two-site distributed transmission system, with transmitters at Kailua and Akupu, Hawaii.

KPXO-TV was a charter affiliate of the network when it began as Pax TV in 1998. Even though it does not have any satellite stations, KPXO-TV is available on cable statewide.

== Technical information ==
=== Subchannels ===
The station's signal is multiplexed:

Subchannels of KPXO-TV
Subchannel	Res.	Short name	Programming
66.1	720p	ION	Ion Television
66.2	720p	CourtTV	Court TV
66.3	480i	Mystery	Ion Mystery
66.4	480i	IONPlus	Ion Plus
66.5	480i	BUSTED	Busted
66.6	480i	GameSho	Game Show Central
66.7	480i	HSN	HSN
66.8	480i	QVC	QVC

=== Analog-to-digital conversion ===
In 2009, KPXO left analog channel 66, continuing on digital channel 41 when the analog to digital conversion was completed.

On April 13, 2017, the FCC announced that KPXO-TV would relocate to RF channel 32 by April 12, 2019 as a result of the broadcast incentive auction.
