= KFVE =

Television station in Kailua-Kona, Hawaii

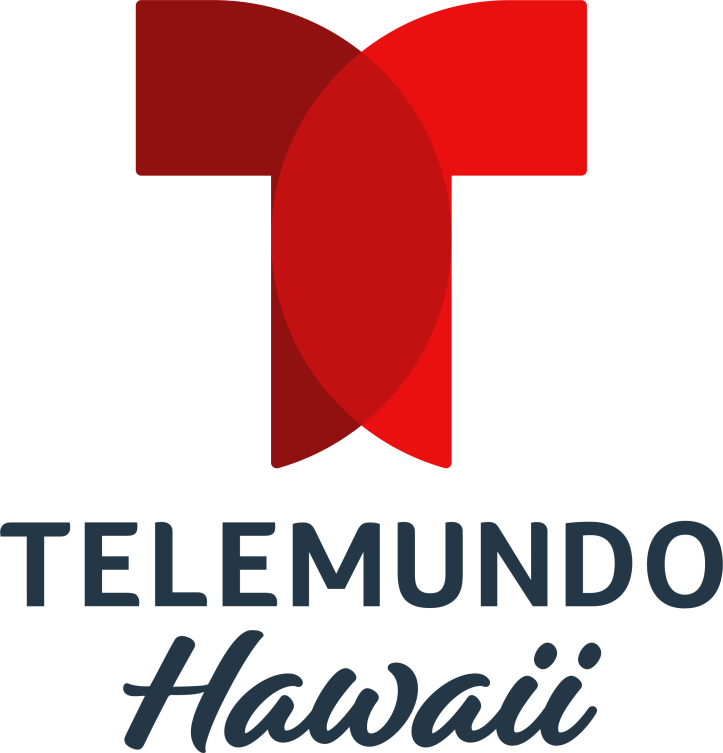
- Kailua-Kona, Hawaii; United States
- Channels: Digital: 25 (UHF); Virtual: 6
- Branding: K5 (general); Telemundo Hawaii (6.2)

Programming
- Affiliations: 6.1: Independent; 6.2: Telemundo

Ownership
- Owner: Gray Media; (Gray Television Licensee, LLC)
- Sister stations: KGMB, KHNL

History
- First air date: 1988
- Former call signs: KVHF (1988–1992); KLEI (1992–2012); KLEI-TV (2012–2018); KSIX-TV (2018–2020)
- Former channel numbers: Analog: 6/87.7 FM (VHF, 1988–2009)
- Former affiliations: Independent (1988–1998); Pax/i/Ion (1998–2011; via KPXO-TV); The Family Channel (2011–2017); Telemundo (2018–2023; now on 6.2)
- Call sign meaning: Prior station using this call sign broadcast on channel 5; .1 subchannel is branded K5

Technical information
- Licensing authority: FCC
- Facility ID: 664
- ERP: 5.5 kW
- HAAT: 825 m (2,707 ft)
- Transmitter coordinates: 19°43′4″N 155°55′6″W

Links
- Public license information: Public file; LMS

Satellite station
- KLEI
- Wailuku, Hawaii
- Channels: Digital: 21 (UHF); Virtual: 21

Programming
- Affiliations: 21.1: Independent; 21.2: Telemundo

Ownership
- Owner: Mango Broadcasting Company, LLC
- Operator: Gray Media via LMA

History
- First air date: June 15, 1993
- Former call signs: KWHM (1991–2018)
- Former channel numbers: Analog: 21 (UHF, 1993–2009)
- Former affiliations: Independent (1993–1995); The WB (1995–1998); LeSEA (1998–2018); Religious Independent (2018); Telemundo (2018–2023; now on 21.2)

Technical information
- Facility ID: 37105
- ERP: 23.5 kW
- HAAT: 755 m (2,477 ft)
- Transmitter coordinates: 20°39′25.5″N 156°21′35.8″W

Links
- Public license information: Public file; LMS

KFVE (channel 6) is a television station licensed to Kailua-Kona, Hawaii, United States, which relays the second and sixth digital subchannels of Honolulu-based NBC affiliate KHNL (channel 13). It is owned by Gray Media alongside KHNL and CBS affiliate KGMB (channel 5). The stations share studios on Waiakamilo Road in Honolulu's Kapālama neighborhood; KFVE's transmitter is located near Kalaoa, Hawaii.

KFVE serves a 7,954-square-mile (20,601 km^{2}) area, and covers an estimated population of 71,400. The station's programming is also seen on satellite station KLEI, channel 21 in Wailuku which is owned by Mango Broadcasting and operated by Gray under a local marketing agreement (LMA).

== History ==
The station went on the air in 1988 as KVHF, a satellite of Mauna Kea Broadcasting's KMGT channel 26, and changed its call letters to KLEI on March 9, 1992. The station was affiliated with Pax TV/i/Ion (as a satellite of KPXO-TV), and later with The Family Channel in 2011.

On October 19, 2012, KLEI was granted statewide must-carry status on the Oceanic Time Warner Cable (now Spectrum) and Hawaiian Telcom cable services, provided it delivers a good quality signal to the cable television headends.

In late 2017, KLEI dropped its Family Channel affiliation and became Hawaii's first over-the-air affiliate of Spanish-language network Telemundo, filling a void in the market for a Spanish language station that opened up when KHLU-CD (a Univision affiliate) ceased operations in 2016. Shortly after assuming the Telemundo affiliation, KLEI became available on all cable systems in Hawaii for the first time.

On December 3, 2018, the station's call sign changed to KSIX-TV.

On July 8, 2020, Gray Television, owner of Honolulu-based stations KGMB and KHNL and their satellites, agreed to purchase KSIX-TV for $1 million, pending approval of the Federal Communications Commission (FCC). Maui-based satellite KLEI was not included in the sale. The transaction was finalized on September 9. The call letters of KSIX-TV and Hilo's KFVE were switched on November 13.

In 2026, KFVE, along with sister stations KGMB and KHNL, would acquire rights to Hawaii Rainbow Warriors and Rainbow Wahine athletics contests.

== Subchannels ==
The stations' signals are multiplexed:

Subchannels of KFVE and KLEI
Subchannel		Res.	Short name	Programming
KFVE	KLEI	Res.	Short name	Programming
6.1	21.1	720p	KFVE-DT	KHNL-DT2 (K5)
6.2	21.2	480i	Telemundo	Telemundo (KHNL-DT6)
