= Akupu, Hawaii =

Unincorporated community in Honolulu County, Hawaii, United States

Coordinates: 21°23′39″N 158°06′11″W

Akupu (also known as Palehua) is a populated place in Honolulu County, Hawaii, United States.
