= KHET =

Television station in Honolulu

KHET and KMEB

KHET: Honolulu, Hawaii; KMEB: Wailuku, Hawaii; United States
- Channels for KHET: Digital: 11 (VHF); Virtual: 11
- Channels for KMEB: Digital: 10 (VHF); Virtual: 10
- Branding: PBS Hawai'i

Programming
- Affiliations: 11.1/10.1: PBS; 11.2/10.2: PBS Kids / NHK World; 11.3/10.3: PBS Kids 24/7

Ownership
- Owner: Hawaii Public Television Foundation

History
- First air date: KHET: April 15, 1966; KMEB: September 22, 1966
- Former channel number: KHET: Analog: 11 (VHF, 1966–2009); Digital: 18 (UHF, until 2009); KMEB: Analog: 10 (VHF, 1966–2009); Digital: 30 (UHF, until 2009)
- Former affiliations: NET (1966–1970)
- Call sign meaning: KHET: Hawaii Educational Television; KMEB: Maui Educational Broadcasting

Technical information
- Licensing authority: FCC
- Facility ID: KHET: 26431; KMEB: 26428
- ERP: KHET: 15.7 kW; KMEB: 21.2 kW
- HAAT: KHET: 625 m (2,051 ft); KMEB: 747 m (2,451 ft)
- Transmitter coordinates: KHET: 21°24′3″N 158°6′10″W; KMEB: 20°39′37″N 156°21′46″W
- Translator: see § Translators

Links
- Public license information: KHET: Public file; LMS; KMEB: Public file; LMS
- Website: www.pbshawaii.org

KHET (channel 11), branded as PBS Hawai'i, is a PBS member television station in Honolulu, Hawaii, United States, serving the Hawaiian Islands. Owned by the Hawaii Public Television Foundation, the station maintains studios at the Clarence T. C. Ching Campus on Sand Island Access Road along Nimitz Highway in Honolulu, and its main transmitter is located on Palehua Ridge, north of Makakilo.

The station's signal is relayed across the rest of the state outside O'ahu and metropolitan Honolulu on full-powered satellite KMEB (channel 10) in Wailuku on Maui (with transmitter at Ulupalakua) and through a network of low-power translators on the other Hawaiian Islands.

== Station history ==
Logo as "PBS Hawai'i"; used from 2016 to early January 2020

KHET signed on the air for the first time on April 15, 1966; KMEB followed on six months later on September 22 of that year. KHET is the second outlet in Honolulu to occupy the channel 11 dial position, the first being KONA-TV from 1952 to 1955, when it moved to channel 2 because the higher VHFs (2 to 6) offered more ERPs at the time; that station is now KHON-TV. Had KONA not moved to channel 2, the channel would have remained a commercial allocation, as the FCC had intended to make channel 7 a non-commercial allocation for Honolulu in the first assignment, but the FCC relocated channel 7 to Wailuku in 1959 and made channel 11 a non-commercial allocation instead (the Wailuku allocation was intended to be on channel 8). Originally known on-air as "Hawaii Educational Television" (or "Hawaii ETV"), it rebranded as "Hawaii Public Television" in 1970 and then became "PBS Hawai'i" in 2003.

PBS Hawai'i had remained one of the few remaining American television stations that continued to sign off during the overnight hours, years after most PBS member stations had transitioned to a 24-hour schedule; until July 14, 2019, its over-the-air broadcast signals transmitted from 5 a.m. to midnight daily, although beginning on July 1, 1996, PBS Hawai'i maintained a separate 24-hour-a-day cable feed containing programming from the PBS Satellite Service during the over-the-air signals' overnight dark period (from midnight to 5 a.m.). On July 15, 2019, coinciding with the launch of its DT3 subchannel (affiliated with PBS Kids 24/7), PBS Hawai'i adopted a 24-hour schedule on its broadcast feed: on that date, the member network's main channel added PBS Satellite Service overnight programming and its DT2 subchannel began offering an expanded schedule of PBS Kids programming in the former downtime.

Original materials from PBS Hawai'i have also been contributed to the American Archive of Public Broadcasting.

== Technical information ==
=== Subchannels ===
The stations' signals are multiplexed:

Subchannels of KHET and KMEB
Subchannel		Res.	Short name	Programming
KHET	KMEB	Res.	Short name	Programming
11.1	10.1	1080i	KHET-1	PBS
11.2	10.2	480i	KHET-2	PBS Kids (midnight–6 p.m.); NHK World (6 p.m.–midnight)
11.3	10.3	480i	KHET-3	PBS Kids

=== Analog-to-digital conversion ===
Both stations ended regular programming on their analog signals, respectively on January 15, 2009, the date on which full-power television stations in Hawaii transitioned from analog to digital broadcasts (almost five months earlier than the June 12 transition date for stations on the U.S. mainland):

- KHET ended regular programming on its analog signal, over VHF channel 11; the station's digital signal relocated from its pre-transition UHF channel 18 to VHF channel 11.
- KMEB ended regular programming on its analog signal, over VHF channel 10; the station's digital signal relocated from its pre-transition UHF channel 30 to VHF channel 10.

=== Translators ===
PBS Hawai'i operates the following low-power translator stations:

- K36IJ-D Anahola
- K36OZ-D Hakalau
- K29HL-D Hanalei
- K28JV-D Hilo
- K34IS-D Kilauea
- K30JE-D Lihue
- K19JW-D Mauna Loa
- K31IZ-D Naalehu
- K35II-D South Point
- K28JM-D Waimea
- K21IA-D Waipake
