= KKAI =

Television station in Kailua, Hawaii

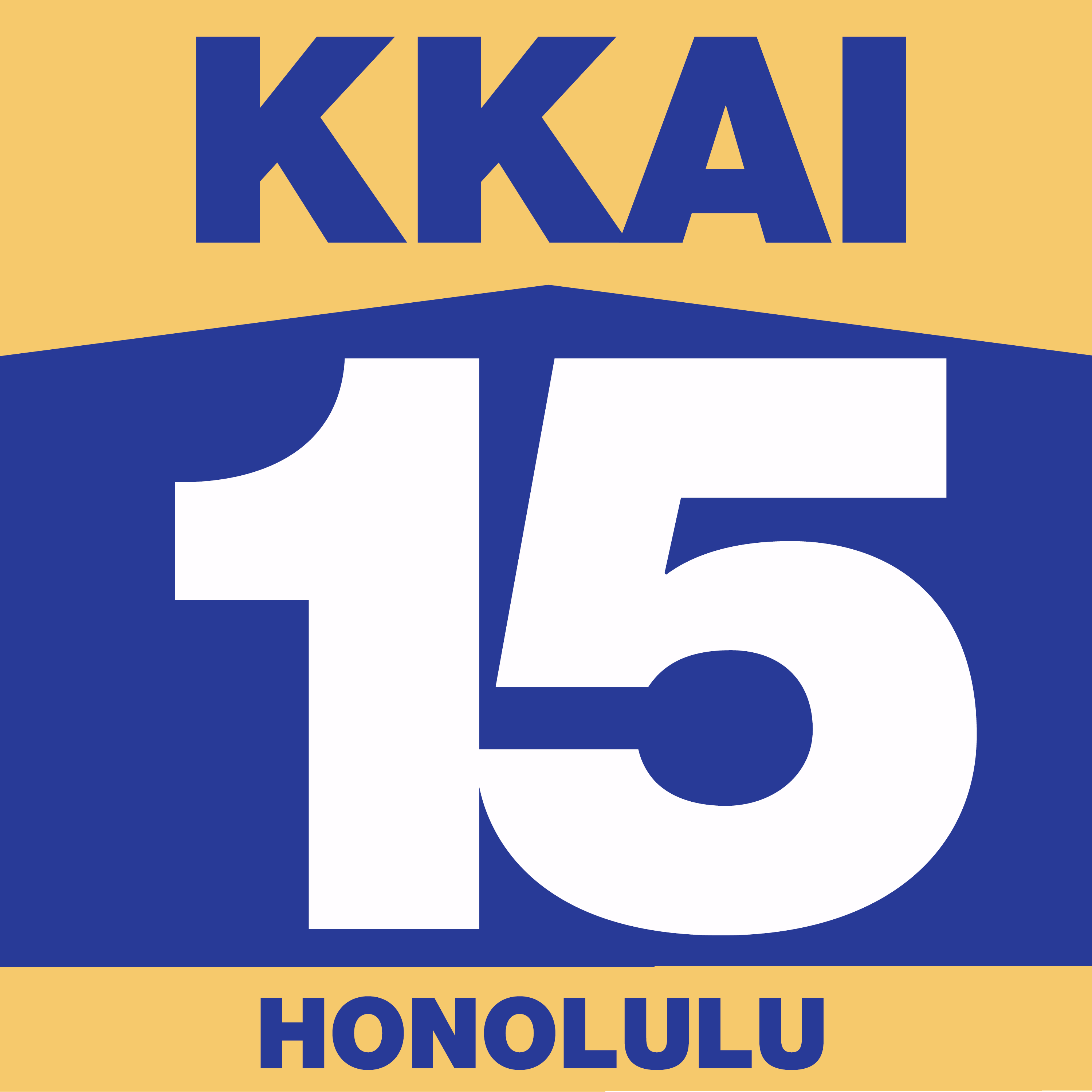
- Kailua–Honolulu, Hawaii; United States
- City: Kailua, Hawaii
- Channels: Digital: 29 (UHF); Virtual: 50
- Branding: KKAI 15 (cable channel)

Programming
- Affiliations: see § Subchannels

Ownership
- Owner: Bridge Media Networks; (Bridge News LLC)
- Sister stations: KUPU

History
- First air date: 2004
- Former channel numbers: Analog: 50 (UHF, 2004–2009); Digital: 50 (UHF, 2009–2019)
- Former affiliations: Faith TV (2004–2012); RTV (2012–2017); Independent (2017–2025); Telemundo (50.2, via KFVE, 2018–2025)
- Call sign meaning: Kailua (city of license)

Technical information
- Licensing authority: FCC
- Facility ID: 83180
- ERP: 38.5 kW
- HAAT: 373 m (1,224 ft)
- Transmitter coordinates: 21°25′19.6″N 157°45′21″W

Links
- Public license information: Public file; LMS
- Website: www.kkai50.com

KKAI (channel 50) is an independent television station licensed to Kailua, Hawaii, United States, serving the Hawaiian Islands. It is owned by Bridge Media Networks alongside KUPU (channel 15). KKAI's transmitter is located north of Kailua. Since March 2018, the station is available statewide on Oceanic Spectrum digital channel 50.

== History ==
The station first hit the air in 2004. Originally intended to sign on as a UPN affiliate, it began airing family programming from Faith TV in addition to local programming. In 2012, the station became a full-time affiliate of the Retro Television Network. In 2017, the station switched to a religious format.

In late 2018, KKAI added Telemundo programming on its second digital subchannel, simulcasting Kailua-Kona–based KFVE.

On October 5, 2023, it was announced that Bridge Media Networks would purchase this station along with KUPU for $3 million ($1.5 million for both stations). The sale was completed in early 2024.

== Technical information ==
=== Subchannels ===
The station's signal is multiplexed:

Subchannels of KKAI
Subchannel	Res.	Short name	Programming
50.1	480i	KKAI	Infomercials
50.2	720p	ShopHQ	Binge TV
50.3	480i	Binge2	Infomercials
50.4	480i	AceTV	Ace TV
50.5	480i	OAN	One America Plus
50.6	480i	YTA	YTA TV
50.7	480i	Sales	Infomercials
50.8	480i	BarkTV	Bark TV
50.9	480i	ZLiving	Z Living
50.10	480i	FTF	FTF Sports
50.11	480i	MTRSPT1	MtrSpt1
50.12	480i	AWE	AWE Plus
50.13	480i	NBT	National Black TV
50.14	480i	Sales2	Infomercials

Subchannel broadcast with MPEG-4 video

=== Analog-to-digital conversion ===
Because it was granted an original construction permit after the FCC finalized the DTV allotment plan on April 21, 1997, the station did not receive a second (companion) channel for a digital television station. On January 15, 2009, KKAI flash-cut to a digital signal on the same channel.

On April 13, 2017, the FCC announced that KKAI would relocate to RF channel 29 by April 12, 2019 as a result of the broadcast incentive auction.
