= KBFD-DT =

Television station in Honolulu

- Honolulu, Hawaii; United States
- Channels: Digital: 33 (UHF); Virtual: 32

Programming
- Affiliations: 32.1: Independent; 32.2: Arirang TV

Ownership
- Owner: The Allen Broadcasting Corp.

History
- Founded: 1984
- First air date: March 24, 1986
- Former call signs: KBFD (1984–2009)
- Former channel numbers: Analog: 32 (UHF, 1986–2009)

Technical information
- Licensing authority: FCC
- Facility ID: 65395
- ERP: 49.6 kW
- HAAT: −36 m (−118 ft)
- Transmitter coordinates: 21°18′38″N 157°51′33″W

Links
- Public license information: Public file; LMS
- Website: kbfd.com

KBFD-DT (channel 32) is an Asian independent television station in Honolulu, Hawaii, United States. The station is owned by Allen Broadcasting (not to be confused with Allen Media Group, owner of ABC affiliate KITV [channel 4] and multicultural independent KIKU [channel 20]). KBFD-DT's studios are located on Bishop Street in downtown Honolulu, and its transmitter is located near Hawaii Pacific University.

Unlike major network affiliates in the Hawaii market, KBFD-DT does not operate any satellite stations or translators, nor is it available on DirecTV or Dish Network. It can only be received via cable outside the Honolulu-area reach of its main signal.

== Overview ==
The station first signed on the air on March 24, 1986. KBFD-DT is one of two television stations in Hawaii that specializes in Asian programming full-time (alongside KIKU). Although the station airs a variety programs from many Asian countries, most of the programs seen on KBFD are geared to a Korean audience as most of its lineup features programs acquired from the Korean Broadcasting System, the Munhwa Broadcasting Corporation, and SBS. Most of the programs on KBFD are also subtitled in English, due to a growing audience of non-Asian viewers interested in its music shows and drama series.

KBFD handles exclusive home video distribution of Korean shows and specials under the KBFDVD brand banner, which the station advertises on air and on their website. KBFD also carries programming from KBS World, the international program service from KBS (broadcasting as KBFD2) on digital subchannel 32.2, Arirang programming on digital subchannel 32.3, and operates the cable channel KLife, a Korean lifestyle programming service.

KBFD airs infomercials during the morning hours (from 6 a.m. to 11 a.m. local time). KBFD is one of a few television stations in the Honolulu market (and the United States as a whole) that continue to sign-off each night from 12:30 a.m. to 6 a.m. local time. Its sign-on and sign-off features the national anthems of both the United States and South Korea.

== Technical information ==
=== Subchannels ===
The station's signal is multiplexed:

Subchannels of KBFD-DT
| Subchannel | Res. | Short name | Programming |
|---|---|---|---|
| 32.1 | 720p | KBFD-D1 | Main KBFD-DT programming |
| 32.2 | 720p | KBFD-D2 | Arirang TV |

=== Analog-to-digital conversion ===
KBFD-TV ended regular programming on its analog signal over UHF channel 32 on January 15, 2009, the date on which full-power television stations in Hawaii transitioned from analog to digital broadcasts under federal mandate. The station's digital signal remained on its pre-transition UHF channel 33, using virtual channel 32.
