= KUPU (TV) =

Television station in Waimanalo, Hawaii

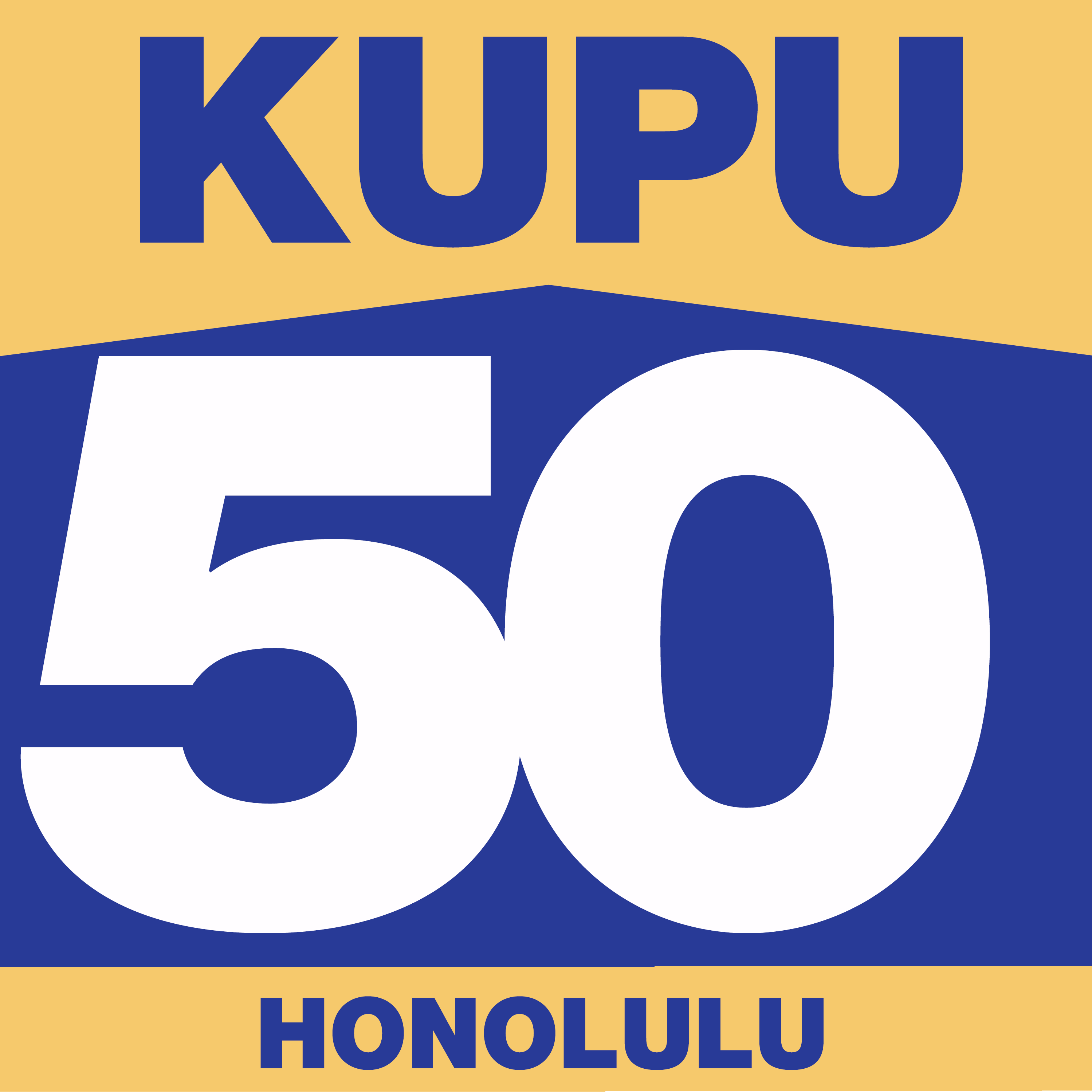
- Waimanalo–Honolulu, Hawaii; United States
- City: Waimanalo, Hawaii
- Channels: Digital: 15 (UHF); Virtual: 56
- Branding: KUPU 50

Programming
- Affiliations: see § Subchannels

Ownership
- Owner: Bridge Media Networks; (Bridge News LLC)
- Sister stations: KKAI

History
- First air date: October 1, 2003
- Former call signs: KMGT (2003–2006)
- Former channel numbers: Analog: 56 (UHF, 2003–2009); Virtual: 15 (until 2025)
- Former affiliations: Antenna TV (2011–2012); Religious independent (2012–2017); Cozi TV (2017–2019); Independent (2019–2025); ShopHQ (2025)
- Call sign meaning: Hawaiian for "to sprout"

Technical information
- Licensing authority: FCC
- Facility ID: 89714
- ERP: DTS1: 12 kW; DTS2: 49.6 kW
- HAAT: DTS1: 373 m (1,224 ft); DTS2: 687 m (2,254 ft)
- Transmitter coordinates: DTS1: 21°19′11.5″N 157°40′43.1″W; DTS2: 21°24′11″N 158°5′51.1″W

Links
- Public license information: Public file; LMS

KUPU (channel 56) is a television station licensed to Waimanalo, Hawaii, United States, serving the Hawaiian Islands. It is owned by Bridge Media Networks alongside KKAI (channel 50). KUPU broadcasts from a two-site distributed transmission system, with transmitters near Waimanalo Beach and at Mauna Kapu at the top of the Waianae mountain range.

== History ==
The Federal Communications Commission (FCC) issued a construction permit to Waimanalo Television Partners on October 17, 2000, to build a full-service television station on UHF channel 56. The new station was given the call letters KMGT. The KMGT call letters were previously used on the TBN owned-and-operated station on channel 26. The station began operating on October 1, 2003, under a Program Test Authority and was officially licensed on June 18, 2004. In September 2006, Oceania Christian Church bought the station from Waimanalo Television Partners and the following month, changed the station's call letters from KMGT to KUPU, derived from the Hawaiian word for "to sprout".

On October 5, 2023, it was announced that Bridge Media Networks would purchase this station along with KKAI for $3 million ($1.5 million for both stations). The sale was completed in early 2024.

== Programming ==
The station previously aired both locally produced and nationally syndicated Catholic-oriented religious programming from CatholicTV, as well as programming from Vatican TV. In 2017, the station affiliated with the NBCUniversal-owned Cozi TV network. KUPU dropped its Cozi TV affiliation sometime in 2020 to return to airing religious programming; as of 2022, Cozi TV has not affiliated with another station in the Honolulu market.

== Technical information ==
=== Subchannels ===
The station's signal is multiplexed:

Subchannels of KUPU
Subchannel	Res.	Short name	Programming
56.1	720p	KUPU	Binge TV
56.2	480i	Funroad	Infomercials
56.3	480i	Binge2	Infomercials
56.4	480i	AceTV	Ace TV
56.5	480i	OAN	One America Plus
56.6	480i	YTA	YTA TV
56.7	480i	Sales	Infomercials
56.8	480i	BarkTV	Bark TV
56.9	480i	ZLiving	Z Living
56.10	480i	FTF	FTF Sports
56.11	480i	MTRSPT1	MtrSpt1
56.12	480i	AWE	AWE Plus
56.13	480i	NBT	National Black TV
56.14	480i	Sales2	Infomercials

Subchannel broadcast with MPEG-4 video

=== Analog-to-digital conversion ===
Because it was granted an original construction permit after the FCC finalized the DTV allotment plan on April 21, 1997, the station did not receive a companion channel for a digital television signal. KUPU shut down its analog signal, over UHF channel 56, on January 15, 2009, the date on which full-power television stations in Hawaii transitioned from analog to digital broadcasts (almost five months earlier than the June 12 transition date for stations on the U.S. mainland).

The station flash-cut its digital signal into operation on UHF channel 15, using virtual channel 56; its former analog channel 56 was among the high band UHF channels (52–69) that were removed from broadcasting use and auctioned by the U.S. government for other uses as a result of the transition. Although stations are required to use a virtual channel that corresponds with their analog channel allocation, KUPU later remapped to virtual channel 15, matching its physical digital signal.
