= 2003 in American television =

In American television during 2003, notable events included television series debuts, finales, cancellations, and new channel initiations.

NCIS (originally referred to as Navy NCIS), a spin-off of JAG, premiered on September 23, 2003 on CBS, becoming the third-longest-running scripted, non-animated American prime-time TV series currently airing, and has later spawned multiple spin-offs and was voted America's favorite television series in 2011. Other notable shows that premiered that year included Arrested Development, Jimmy Kimmel Live!, Two and a Half Men, The Venture Bros., One Tree Hill, The O.C., Nip/Tuck, and Teen Titans.

Later 2010s/2020s TV shows like Better Call Saul (2015–2022) and the television adaptation of The Last of Us (2023–present) are set in 2003.

== Events ==
=== January ===
Date	Event
2	ABC affiliate WBKP in Calumet, Michigan greatly improves its coverage area in the Upper Peninsula when it signs-on satellite station WBUP in Ishpeming.
20	KMAY-LP (now KAGS-LD) in Bryan, Texas signs-on as a satellite of Temple-based NBC affiliate KCEN-TV.
26	The 37th edition of the Super Bowl is broadcast on ABC, making the last ever Super Bowl to be scheduled on January. The Tampa Bay Buccaneers win their first championship, defeating the Oakland Raiders by score of 48–21. John Madden, who provided color commentary alongside Al Michaels, becomes the first person to announce Super Bowls on different networks in consecutive years, having called Super Bowl XXXVI on Fox.

=== February ===
Date	Event
16	The 300th episode of the series The Simpsons is broadcast on Fox the same night as the Married... with Children reunion special.
21	Late Show host David Letterman begins a few weeks' leave from the CBS talk show due to a bout of shingles (during this time, guest hosts will include Bruce Willis, Regis Philbin, Will Ferrell and Elvis Costello).
24	CBS Evening News anchor Dan Rather interviews Saddam Hussein on national television, shortly before the Iraq invasion began.
24	The miniseries Giant Robot Week is broadcast by Cartoon Network, which includes 2 edited episodes of Neon Genesis Evangelion. This is the first attempt to broadcast the series by network TV.
26	On CBS, The Young and the Restless celebrates its 30th anniversary.
27	Fred Rogers, host of the television series Mister Rogers’ Neighborhood dies of stomach cancer at the age of 74.

=== March ===
Date	Event
27	C-SPAN airs a press conference being held in the White House in which President George W. Bush and British Prime Minister Tony Blair spoke about the 2003 Invasion of Iraq which had begun roughly one week prior. The event was one of the most-watched C-SPAN broadcasts of the year according to Nielsen ratings and was simultaneously broadcast on CNN and Fox News. A similar broadcast in April of the following year was similarly widely viewed.
29	K13VC ends operations.

=== April ===
Date	Event
1	On ABC, General Hospital celebrates its 40th anniversary.
1	WRBU was disaffiliated from the Home Shopping Network to become a UPN station.
5	Everyday Italian debuts on Food Network hosted by Giada De Laurentiis. The show, which De Laurentiis focuses for her viewers on traditional Italian cuisine with an American flair, would result in becoming one of Food Network's most popular daytime cooking shows.
7	Noggin revises its branding and lineup, introducing new hosts Moose and Zee, and a new slogan, "It's Like Preschool on TV."
12	All Grown Up!, a spin-off of Rugrats, premieres right after the 2003 Kids' Choice Awards on Nickelodeon.
22	Bianca Montgomery (Eden Riegel) kisses Lena Kundera (Olga Sosnovska) on the ABC soap opera All My Children; this is the first lesbian kiss on American daytime television.
22-29	The two-part backdoor pilot for NCIS airs as part of the CBS series JAG.

=== May ===
Date	Event
1	TBS broadcast its last NBA game (not counting alternate broadcasts or simulcasts of the NBA All-Star Game and overflow broadcast of playoff games) to date. Subsequent NBA playoff games on the Turner Sports family of networks were broadcast on either TNT or NBA TV.
8	Nancy Christy becomes the first woman to win $1,000,000 on the syndicated version of Who Wants to Be a Millionaire.
8	On a special episode of Primetime entitled Major Fraud (which originally aired as an episode of Tonight on ITV on April 21), segments of an unaired 2001 episode of the British version of Millionaire featuring Charles Ingram were broadcast. The program featured additional interviews with witnesses of the criminal trial that happened after Ingram was stripped of the £1,000,000 prize; Ingram had been found guilty of deception at Southwark Crown Court on April 7.
16	The 30th Daytime Emmy Awards are given, in a ceremony telecast by ABC.
19	ABC broadcasts a four-hour 50th anniversary special.
20	America's Next Top Model premieres on UPN. UPN also aired the final episode of Buffy the Vampire Slayer after 2 additional seasons and 44 episodes after being picked up by The WB (after being the smash hit on the network in the series's beginnings).
21	On Fox, Ruben Studdard becomes the winner of American Idol – season two. His debut single "Flying Without Wings" reaches number two in the Billboard Hot 100 in June 2003.

=== June ===
Date	Event
12	The infamous "ring collapse" episode of SmackDown! is aired on UPN. The incident occurred after Brock Lesnar superplexed The Big Show from the top rope during a match for the WWE Championship.
13	Liz Cho co-anchors her last World News Now newscast on ABC before heading to the network's flagship station WABC-TV in New York City. She is replaced by Andrea Stassou.

=== July ===
Date	Event
14	David Muir is named the new co-anchor of ABC's World News Now, replacing Derek McGinty, who left for WUSA in Washington, D.C.

=== August ===
Date	Event

=== September ===
Date	Event
1	In Casper, Wyoming, Pax TV affiliate KCWY switches its affiliation to NBC, taking that affiliation from KTWO-TV which will join ABC in March 2004. In the interim, KTWO-TV becomes an independent station with select programming from Pax.
8	Amerie, host of BET's The Center, leaves the show so she could work on her new music.
10	UPN's series Enterprise begins a season-long story sequence – the first time a full season of a Star Trek series has been devoted to one storyline. (Three episodes into the new season, the series title is changed to Star Trek: Enterprise.)
11	John Ritter dies from an undiagnosed aortic dissection at the age of 54 hours after falling ill on the set of his sitcom 8 Simple Rules for Dating My Teenage Daughter.
11	Wheel of Fortune incorporates "Prize Puzzle" in one of the first three rounds and awards a trip to the contestant who solve the themed puzzle for this round. The initial incarnation occurs weekly during the first two seasons of appearance, but has changed to a daily format beginning on Season 23 and has used since.
21	The CBS comedy Everybody Loves Raymond wins its first Outstanding Comedy award and the NBC drama The West Wing wins its fourth straight Emmy for Outstanding Drama Series at the 55th Primetime Emmy Awards. The ceremonies are telecast by Fox.
22	The pilot episode for Two and a Half Men is broadcast on CBS.

=== October ===
Date	Event
1	James Marsters joins the cast of Angel on The WB, carrying his Buffy the Vampire Slayer character of Spike over from the former series.
4	Kenan Thompson makes his first appearance as a cast member on the NBC sketch comedy series Saturday Night Live. Thompson would eventually become the longest serving cast member in SNL history.
16	On Fox, the New York Yankees win Game 7 of the ALCS over the Boston Red Sox with a walk-off home run by Aaron Boone from pitcher Tim Wakefield.
20	Rod Roddy makes his final appearance as announcer of The Price Is Right on CBS. Roddy died from colon cancer exactly a week later, on October 27.
25	Game 6 of the World Series airs on Fox. The Florida Marlins win their second world championship over the New York Yankees. Marlins starter Josh Beckett made the final out by tagging Jorge Posada through first base, making this one of the biggest upsets in baseball history. This was the very last World Series played at the original Yankee Stadium before its demolition in 2008.

=== November ===
Date	Event
2	CBS at 75, the special celebrating the network's 75th anniversary, is broadcast by CBS.
10	The 4,000th episode of Wheel of Fortune (since the 1982 pairing of host and hostess Pat Sajak and Vanna White) is broadcast in syndication, featuring a clip show of Wheel's most memorable moments over the years. The milestone episode would air in syndication on January 23, 2004.
19	The 2003 Victoria's Secret Fashion Show is broadcast on CBS. 9.4 million people tune in.

=== December ===
Date	Event
2	Tamala Edwards is named the new co-anchor of ABC's World News Now, replacing Andrea Stassou.
20	During a National Football League game between the New England Patriots at New York Jets, former Jets quarterback Joe Namath in a sideline interview with ESPN's Suzy Kolber twice stated that he wanted to kiss her, and "couldn't care less about the team strugg-a-ling." Namath later apologized and blamed the incident on his obvious intoxication. Soon after, Namath entered an outpatient alcoholism treatment program. Namath chronicled the episode, including his battle with alcoholism in his book, Namath (ISBN 0-67003-329-4).

== Programs ==
=== Debuts ===
Date	Show	Network	Ref.
January 5	High School Reunion	The WB	
January 6	The Berenstain Bears	PBS Kids	
January 6	Joe Millionaire	Fox	
January 6	Abby	UPN	
January 6	Dirty Rotten Cheater	PAX TV	
January 8	The Bachelorette	ABC	
January 8	Storm Stories	The Weather Channel	
January 9	The Surreal Life	The WB	
January 10	Mister Sterling	NBC	
January 10	Queens Supreme	CBS	
January 17	That's So Raven	Disney Channel	
January 22	Chappelle's Show	Comedy Central	
January 23	106 & Park: Prime	BET	
January 23	MythBusters	Discovery Channel	
January 24	Penn & Teller: Bullshit!	Showtime	
January 26	Jimmy Kimmel Live!	ABC	
January 27	Ask Rita	Syndication	
January 27	Miracles	ABC	
January 27	Veritas: The Quest	ABC	
February 2	Kingpin	NBC	
February 2	Dragnet	ABC	
February 4	A.U.S.A.	NBC	
February 6	Critical Rescue	Discovery Channel	
February 8	Teenage Mutant Ninja Turtles	Fox Box	
February 13	Are You Hot?	ABC	
February 16	The Venture Bros.	Adult Swim	
February 19	I'm a Celebrity...Get Me Out of Here!	ABC	
February 21	Da Ali G Show	HBO	
February 21	Real Time with Bill Maher	HBO	
February 21	Family Business	Showtime	
February 24	My Big Fat Greek Life	CBS	
February 24	Animal Jam	TLC/Discovery Kids	
February 24	Hi-5	TLC/Discovery Kids	
February 26	Fraternity Life	MTV	
March 1	Stuart Little	HBO Family	
March 2	The Michael Essany Show	E!	
March 3	Live Prayer	WTOG	
March 3	The Center	BET	
March 3	Married by America	Fox	
March 4	The Family	ABC	
March 9	Oliver Beene	Fox	
March 11	The Save-Ums!	TLC/Discovery Kids	
March 17	Punk'd	MTV	
March 20	On the Spot	The WB	
March 26	Wanda at Large	Fox	
March 28	America's Most Talented Kid	NBC	
March 30	Black Sash	The WB	
March 30	The Pitts	Fox	
March 31	American Chopper	Discovery Channel	
April 1	What Should You Do?	Lifetime	
April 1	Lost at Home	ABC	
April 5	Everyday Italian	Food Network	
April 7	Miffy and Friends	Noggin	
April 7	Tweenies	Noggin	
April 12	All Grown Up!	Nickelodeon	
April 13	MXC	Spike	
April 14	Boohbah	PBS Kids	
April 14	Platinum	UPN	
April 21	Mr. Personality	Fox	
May 6	Jim Rome Is Burning	ESPN	
May 12	Surf Girls	MTV	
May 12	Dinotopia	ABC	
May 15	DaySide with Linda Vester	Fox News Channel	
May 17	Adventure Camp	Discovery Kids	
May 17	Trading Spaces: Boys vs. Girls	Discovery Kids	
May 20	America's Next Top Model	UPN	
May 22	The O'Keefes	The WB	
May 26	Unscrewed with Martin Sargent	TechTV	
May 28	Fame	NBC	
June 1	Monster House	Discovery Channel	
June 1	Last Comic Standing	NBC	
June 2	For Love or Money	NBC	
June 2	Totally Pets	PAX TV	
June 3	Hey Joel	VH1	
June 3	Keen Eddie	Fox	
June 3	American Juniors	Fox	
June 13	The Grim Adventures of Billy & Mandy	Cartoon Network	
June 15	Charlie Lawrence	CBS	
June 18	Paradise Hotel	Fox	
June 18	Boarding House: North Shore	The WB	
June 26	Stripperella	Spike	
June 26	Gary the Rat	Spike	
June 27	Dead Like Me	Showtime	
July 11	Evil Con Carne	Cartoon Network	
July 11	Free for All	Showtime	
July 11	Spider-Man: The New Animated Series	MTV	
July 13	Dance Fever	ABC Family	
July 14	Who Wants to Marry My Dad?	NBC	
July 15	Queer Eye	Bravo	
July 19	Teen Titans	Cartoon Network	
July 20	The Restaurant	NBC	
July 22	Nip/Tuck	FX	
July 23	Reno 911!	Comedy Central	
July 30	Peacemakers	USA Network	
July 30	Race to the Altar	NBC	
August 1	My Life as a Teenage Robot	Nickelodeon	
August 5	The O.C.	Fox	
August 8	Girls v. Boys	Noggin (during "The N" block)	
August 18	I Love the '70s	VH1	
August 19	Wild West Tech	History	
August 19	Newlyweds: Nick and Jessica	MTV	
August 23	Duck Dodgers	Cartoon Network	
August 26	Playmakers	ESPN	
August 29	Cowboy U	CMT	
September 1	Tactical to Practical	History	
September 2	The Joe Schmo Show	Paramount Network	
September 7	Jakers! The Adventures of Piggley Winks	PBS Kids	
September 8	Anderson Cooper 360°	CNN	
September 8	Connie the Cow	Noggin	
September 8	The Ellen DeGeneres Show	Syndication	
September 8	Starting Over	Syndication	
September 9	Happy Family	NBC	
September 9	Whoopi	NBC	
September 10	Jake 2.0	UPN	
September 11	The Mullets	UPN	
September 11	Run of the House	The WB	
September 11	Steve Harvey's Big Time Challenge	The WB	
September 12	All About the Andersons	The WB	
September 13	Romeo!	Nickelodeon	
September 13	Eye for an Eye	Syndication	
September 14	Carnivàle	HBO	
September 14	K Street	HBO	
September 15	Living It Up! with Ali & Jack	Syndication	
September 15	The Sharon Osbourne Show	Syndication	
September 15	Eve	UPN	
September 15	Rock Me Baby	UPN	
September 16	All of Us	UPN	
September 18	Threat Matrix	ABC	
September 19	Like Family	The WB	
September 19	Luis	Fox	
September 20	Lilo & Stitch: The Series	Disney Channel	
September 20	Clifford's Puppy Days	PBS Kids	
September 22	Las Vegas	NBC	
September 22	Two and a Half Men	CBS	
September 23	NCIS	CBS	
September 23	I'm with Her	ABC	
September 23	One Tree Hill	The WB	
September 24	The Brotherhood of Poland, New Hampshire	CBS	
September 25	Coupling	NBC	
September 26	Miss Match	NBC	
September 26	The Handler	CBS	
September 26	Joan of Arcadia	CBS	
September 26	Hope & Faith	ABC	
September 27	Teen Kids News	Syndication	
September 28	10-8: Officers on Duty	ABC	
September 28	Cold Case	CBS	
September 28	JoJo's Circus	Playhouse Disney	
September 28	The Lyon's Den	NBC	
October 1	It's All Relative	ABC	
October 1	Karen Sisco	ABC	
October 3	Married to the Kellys	ABC	
October 4	Battlefield Detectives	History	
October 5	Animal Tails	PAX TV	
October 5	Tarzan	The WB	
October 6	The Big Break	Golf Channel	
October 6	Knock First	ABC Family	
October 12	Shootout	AMC	
October 13	King of the Jungle	Animal Planet	
October 13	Room Raiders	MTV	
October 17	VH1 ILL-ustrated	VH1	
October 19	When Ruled the World	VH1	
October 20	Cold Pizza	ESPN2	
October 20	Skin	Fox	
October 22	Kid Notorious	Comedy Central	
October 26	Viva La Bam	MTV	
October 26	Wildboyz	MTV	
October 28	Rich Girls	MTV	
October 29	A Minute with Stan Hooper	Fox	
October 30	Tru Calling	Fox	
November 1	Kenny the Shark	Discovery Kids	
November 1	Tutenstein	Discovery Kids	
November 1	Xiaolin Showdown	Kids' WB	
November 2	Arrested Development	Fox	
November 3	Average Joe	NBC	
November 7	Dirty Jobs	Discovery Channel	
November 7	Star Wars: Clone Wars	Cartoon Network	
November 10	Sabrina's Secret Life	Syndication	
December 1	Poko	TLC	
December 2	Celebrity Poker Showdown	Bravo	
December 2	The Simple Life	Fox	
December 2	The Tracy Morgan Show	NBC	
December 2	Line of Fire	ABC	
December 3	Extreme Makeover: Home Edition	ABC	
December 21	Ancient Discoveries	History	

=== Returning this year ===
Show	Channel	Last aired	New title	New network	Returning
The Weekenders	ABC, UPN	2001	Same	Toon Disney	March 21
The Ren and Stimpy Show	Nickelodeon, MTV	1996	Ren & Stimpy "Adult Party Cartoon"	Spike	June 26

=== Ending this year ===
Date	Show	Network	Debut	Status
January 1	Cooking Live	Food Network	1997	Cancelled
January 1	Truth or Scare	Discovery Kids	2001	Cancelled
January 3	Cita's World	BET	1999	Cancelled
January 12	Andy Richter Controls the Universe	Fox	2002	Cancelled
January 14	In-Laws	NBC	2002	Cancelled
January 21	Hidden Hills	NBC	2002	Cancelled
January 24	Presidio Med	CBS	2002	Cancelled
January 30	Columbo	ABC	1968	Cancelled
January 31	Win Ben Stein's Money	Comedy Central	1997	Cancelled
February 2	Super Duper Sumos	Nickelodeon	2002	Cancelled
February 5	The Legend of Tarzan	UPN	2001	Cancelled
February 7	3-South	MTV	2002	Cancelled
February 16	For the People	Lifetime	2002	Cancelled
February 17	Birds of Prey	The WB	2002	Cancelled
February 22	The Nick Cannon Show	Nickelodeon	2002	Cancelled
February 23	Oz	HBO	1997	Ended
February 25	Clifford the Big Red Dog (returned in 2019 and will also return again in 2027)	PBS Kids	2000	Cancelled
March 7	Talkback Live	CNN	1994	Cancelled
March 10	Veritas: The Quest	ABC	2003	Cancelled
March 13	Family Affair	The WB	2002	Cancelled
March 21	Farscape	Sci-Fi Channel	1999	Cancelled
April 1	Friend or Foe?	GSN	2002	Cancelled
April 1	WinTuition	GSN	2002	Cancelled
April 4	Liberty's Kids	PBS Kids	2002	Cancelled
April 13	Clone High (returned in 2023)	MTV	2002	Cancelled
April 13	My Big Fat Greek Life	CBS	2003	Cancelled
April 17	On the Spot	The WB	2003	Cancelled
April 21	Robbery Homicide Division	USA Network	2002	Cancelled
April 24	Sabrina the Teenage Witch	The WB	1996	Cancelled
April 25	Fastlane	Fox	2002	Cancelled
April 25	John Doe	Fox	2002	Cancelled
April 26	Cubix: Robots for Everyone	Kids' WB	2001	Cancelled
April 27	Touched by an Angel	CBS	1994	Ended
May 4	120 Minutes (returned in 2011)	MTV	1986	Cancelled
May 7	Stargate Infinity	Fox	2002	Cancelled
May 9	Greetings from Tucson	The WB	2002	Cancelled
May 14	Dawson's Creek	The WB	1998	Ended
May 16	Cartoon Cartoon Fridays	Cartoon Network	1999	Cancelled
May 17	The Agency	CBS	2001	Cancelled
May 20	The Weakest Link (returned in 2020)	NBC	2001	Cancelled
May 20	Buffy the Vampire Slayer	UPN	1997	Ended
May 20	Watching Ellie	NBC	2002	Cancelled
May 21	Change of Heart	Syndication	1998	Cancelled
May 21	The Jenny Jones Show	Syndication	1991	Cancelled
May 21	The Other Half	Syndication	2001	Cancelled
May 21	The Caroline Rhea Show	Syndication	2002	Cancelled
May 21	The Twilight Zone	Syndication	2002	Cancelled
May 23	Supermarket Sweep (returned in 2020)	PAX TV	1965	Cancelled
May 24	Stuart Little	HBO Family	2003	Cancelled
June 1	Black Sash	The WB	2003	Cancelled
June 5	Cedric the Entertainer Presents	Fox	2002	Cancelled
June 7	The Mummy: The Animated Series	Kids' WB	2001	Cancelled
June 13	Even Stevens	Disney Channel	2000	Cancelled
June 13	Russian Roulette	GSN	2002	Cancelled
June 17	Hey Joel	VH1	2003	Cancelled
June 20	Baby Bob	CBS	2002	Cancelled
June 26	30 Seconds to Fame	Fox	2002	Cancelled
July 1	Say What? Karaoke	MTV	1998	Cancelled
July 3	Primetime Glick	Comedy Central	2001	Cancelled
July 5	Sitting Ducks	Cartoon Network	2001	Cancelled
July 7	Surf Girls	MTV	2003	Cancelled
July 20	The Popeye Show	Cartoon Network	2001	Cancelled
July 24	Ren & Stimpy "Adult Party Cartoon"	TNN/Spike TV	2003	Cancelled
July 25	The Living Century	PBS	2000	Cancelled
August 3	Doggy Fizzle Televizzle	MTV	2002	Cancelled
August 10	Futurama (returned in 2008)	Fox	1999	Cancelled
August 16	Scaredy Camp	Nickelodeon	2002	Cancelled
August 20	Beg, Borrow & Deal	ESPN	2002	Cancelled
August 20	Ripley's Believe It or Not! (returned in 2019)	TBS	2000	Cancelled
August 22	I Love the '70s	VH1	2003	Cancelled
August 24	Dance Fever	Freeform	2003	Cancelled
August 28	Critical Rescue	Discovery Channel	2003	Cancelled
September 12	Free for All	Showtime	2003	Cancelled
September 12	Spider-Man: The New Animated Series	MTV	2003	Cancelled
September 19	Oswald	Nickelodeon	2001	Cancelled
September 20	Star Dates	E!	2002	Cancelled
September 29	Temptation Island (returned in 2019)	Fox	2001	Cancelled
October 3	Port Charles	ABC	1997	Cancelled
October 6	Seven Little Monsters	PBS Kids	2000	Cancelled
October 8	Peacemakers	USA	2003	Cancelled
October 12	Secret, Strange & True	TechTV	2002	Cancelled
October 17	Luis	Fox	2003	Cancelled
October 22	The Brotherhood of Poland, New Hampshire	CBS	2003	Cancelled
October 23	Coupling	NBC	2003	Cancelled
October 24	House of Mouse	Toon Disney	2001	Cancelled
October 25	X-Men: Evolution	Kids' WB	2000	Cancelled
October 29	Street Time	Showtime	2002	Cancelled
November 7	Wanda at Large	Fox	2003	Cancelled
November 9	Family Guy (returned in 2005)	Adult Swim	1999	Cancelled
November 11	Playmakers	ESPN	2003	Cancelled
November 14	Whatever Happened to... Robot Jones?	Cartoon Network	2002	Cancelled
November 16	K Street	HBO	2003	Cancelled
November 20	Dexter's Laboratory	Cartoon Network	1996	Cancelled
November 23	ToonHeads	Cartoon Network	1992	Cancelled
November 23	Tarzan	The WB	2003	Cancelled
November 24	Joe Millionaire	Fox	2003	Cancelled
November 26	Just Shoot Me!	Syndication	1997	Ended
November 26	Time Squad	Cartoon Network	2001	Cancelled
November 30	The Lyon's Den	NBC	2003	Cancelled
December 1	Conquest	History Channel	2002	Cancelled
December 3	The Jeff Corwin Experience	Animal Planet	2000	Cancelled
December 5	Whammy! The All-New Press Your Luck	GSN	2002	Cancelled
December 11	Gary the Rat	Spike TV	2003	Cancelled
December 12	A Minute with Stan Hooper	Fox	2003	Cancelled
December 15	Miss Match	NBC	2003	Cancelled
December 17	Kid Notorious	Comedy Central	2003	Cancelled
December 18	Good Morning, Miami	NBC	2002	Cancelled
December 28	Boomtown	NBC	2002	Cancelled
December 30	Rich Girls	MTV	2003	Cancelled
December 31	The Brak Show	Adult Swim	2000	Cancelled

=== Entering syndication this year ===
Show	Seasons	In Production	Source
Angel	September 8, 2003 - August 31, 2007	Yes	
Becker	September 8, 2003 - September 7, 2007	No	
The King of Queens	September 15, 2003 - September 9, 2024	Yes	
Judging Amy	September 29, 2003 - July 20, 2007	Yes	
The Parkers	September 15, 2003 - August 25, 2006	Yes	

=== Changes of network affiliation ===
Show	Moved from	Moved to
Da Ali G Show	Channel 4 (UK)	HBO
The Ren & Stimpy Show	Nickelodeon	Spike
Teamo Supremo	ABC	Toon Disney
Fillmore!	ABC	Toon Disney
The Weekenders	ABC/UPN	Toon Disney
Grounded for Life	Fox	The WB
Totally Spies!	ABC Family	Cartoon Network

=== Made-for-TV movies ===
Title	Network	Date of airing
You Wish!	Disney Channel	January 10
Maniac Magee	Nickelodeon	February 23
Right on Track	Disney Channel	March 21
The Even Stevens Movie	Disney Channel	June 13
Abra-Catastrophe!	Nickelodeon	July 12
The Cheetah Girls	Disney Channel	August 15
Red Water	TBS	August 17
Kim Possible: A Sitch in Time	Disney Channel	November 28
National Lampoon's Christmas Vacation 2	NBC	December 20

== Networks and services ==
=== Launches ===
Network	Type	Launch date	Notes	Source
Starz! Kids	Cable television	Unknown		
HRTV	Cable and satellite	January 1		
HDNet Movies	Cable and satellite	January 13		
GOL TV	Cable and satellite	February 1		
¡Sorpresa!	Cable television	March 15		
Sportsman Channel	Cable and satellite	April 1		
Tennis Channel	Cable and satellite	May 15		
Fuel TV	Cable television	July 1		
Bravo HD+	Cable and satellite	July 31		
Arirang Radio	Cable television	September 1		
NFL Network	Cable and satellite	November 4		

=== Conversions and rebrandings ===
Old network name	New network name	Type	Conversion Date	Notes	Source
Discovery Civilization Channel	Discovery Times	Cable television	Unknown		
nba.com TV	NBA TV	Cable television	February 11		
National College Sports Network	College Sports Television	Cable television	February 23		
MMUSA	Fuse	Cable and satellite	May 19		
The New TNN	Spike TV	Cable and satellite	August 11		

=== Closures ===
Network	Type	Closure date	Notes	Source
American Christian Television System	Cable and satellite	Unknown		

== Television stations ==
=== Station launches ===
Date	City of License/Market	Station	Channel	Affiliation	Notes/Ref.
January 2	Ishpeming/Marquette, Michigan	WBUP	10	ABC	
January 20	Bryan/College Station, Texas	KMAY-LP	23	NBC	Semi-satellite of KCEN/Temple
January 30	Rochelle/Chicago, Illinois	WCHU-LP	33	Azteca America	
February 2	Marquette, Michigan	WMQF	19	Fox (primary); UPN (secondary)	
February 18	Roswell, New Mexico	KRWB	21	The WB	Satellite of KWBQ/Santa Fe
March 3	Salisbury, Maryland	WBOC-DT2	21.2	UPN	
April	Provo, Utah	KUTH	32	Independent	
April 13	Bangor, Maine	W22BU	22	Fox	
April 23	Medford, Oregon	K14LG	14	Telemundo	
May 2	Butte, Montana	KBTZ	24	Fox	
May 7	Tallahassee, Florida	WTLF	24	UPN	Satellite of WFXU/Live Oak
June 11	Great Falls, Montana	KLMN	26	Fox	
July 27	Longview/Tyler, Texas	KCEB	54	UPN	
August 21	Laughlin, Nevada	KMCC	34	NBC	Satellite of KVBC/Las Vegas
September 22	Rockford, Illinois	WTVO-DT2	17.2	UPN	
September 29	Vicksburg/Jackson, Mississippi	WLOO	35	Fox \	
October 1	Waimanalo, Hawaii	KMGT	14	Religious independent	
October 7	Hanamaulu, Hawaii	K06NC	6	Independent	
October 11	El Dorado, Arkansas (Monroe, Louisiana)	KEJB	43	America One	
October 18	Pittsburg, Kansas (Joplin, Missouri)	KFJX	14	Fox	
October 24	Price, Utah	KUTF	3	TeleFutura	
November 4	Pago Pago, American Samoa	K38HX	38	NBC	
November 4	Pago Pago, American Samoa	K34HI	34	Fox	
Unknown date	Beaumont, Texas	KUIL-LP	64	Fox	
Unknown date	Charleston, South Carolina	WJEA-LP	12	Telemundo	
Unknown date	Christiansted, U.S. Virgin Islands	WVIF	15	Pax TV	Independent
Unknown date	Crookston, Minnesota	KCGE-DT	16	PBS	Part of the Prairie Public Television network
Unknown date	Denver, Colorado	KCIN-LP	27	Independent	
Unknown date	Grand Forks, North Dakota	KCFM	27	UPN	
Unknown date	Knoxville, Tennessee	WVLT-DT2	8.2 (digital)	UPN	
Unknown date	Norman/Oklahoma City, Oklahoma	KOCM	46	Daystar	
Unknown date	Pullman, Washington	KQUP	24	UPN	
Unknown date	Salt Lake City, Utah	K23GP	23	Spanish independent	
Unknown date	Sun Valley/Twin Falls, Idaho	KIDA	5	UPN	

=== Network affiliation changes ===
Date	City of License/Market	Station	Channel	Old affiliation	New affiliation	Notes/Ref.
April	Waterville/Portland, Maine	WPFO	23	Pax TV (as WMPX-TV)	Fox	
September 1	Casper, Wyoming	KCWY	13	Pax TV	NBC	
October 1	Sioux Falls, South Dakota	KWSD	36	Pax TV (as KAUN)	The WB	
Unknown date	Louisville, Kentucky	W24BW	24	MuchUSA	America One	

=== Station closures ===
Date	City of license/Market	Station	Channel	Affiliation	Sign-on date	Notes
October 27	Marquette, Michigan	WUPT-CA	25	UPN	January 8, 1980	

== Births ==
Date	Name	Notability
January 4	Jaeden Martell	Actor (Masters of Sex)
January 9	Megan Richie	Actress (Legendary Dudas, Jake and the Neverland Pirates)
January 21	Garren Stitt	Actor (Andi Mack, General Hospital)
January 23	Ivan Mallon	Actor (School of Rock)
January 24	Johnny Orlando	Canadian actor
January 28	Anton Starkman	Actor (Warped!)
January 28	Whitney Peak	Actress (Chilling Adventures of Sabrina, Home Before Dark, Gossip Girl)
February 4	Kyla Kenedy	Actress (The Walking Dead, Speechless)
February 7	Reed Horstmann	Actor (The Villains of Valley View)
February 20	Olivia Rodrigo	Actress (Bizaardvark, High School Musical: The Musical: The Series)
March 1	Yasmeen Fletcher	Actress and musician (Ms. Marvel, Andi Mack)
March 3	Thomas Barbusca	Actor (The Mick)
March 8	Montana Jordan	Actor (Young Sheldon)
March 12	Malina Weissman	Actress
April 13	Olivia Sanabia	Actress (Just Add Magic, Coop and Cami Ask the World)
April 15	Julia Antonelli	Actress (Every Witch Way, WITS Academy)
April 15	Sam Ashe Arnold	Actor (Best.Worst.Weekend.Ever., Are You Afraid of the Dark?)
April 16	Alina Foley	Actress (The League, Shimmer and Shine)
April 18	Benjamin Cole Royer	Actors (Best Friends Whenever)
April 18	Matthew Lewis Royer	Actors (Best Friends Whenever)
April 19	Caleel Harris	Voice actor (Blaze and the Monster Machines, The Loud House)
April 30	Emily Carey	Actor
May 1	Lizzy Greene	Actress (Nicky, Ricky, Dicky & Dawn, A Million Little Things)
May 11	Dora Dolphin	Actress
May 16	Ariana Molkara	Actress (Warped!)
May 18	Lukas Rodriguez	Actor (Malcolm in the Middle)
May 19	JoJo Siwa	Actress (Dance Moms) and singer
June 2	Jeremy Ray Taylor	Actor (Are You Afraid of the Dark?)
June 11	Breanna Yde	Actress (The Haunted Hathaways, School of Rock, The Loud House)
June 15	Galilea La Salvia	Actress (Talia in the Kitchen)
June 16	Anna Cathcart	Canadian actress (Odd Squad)
July 5	Terrell Ransom Jr.	Actor (Days of Our Lives, The Amazing World of Gumball)
July 9	Marcel Ruiz	Actor
July 11	Meg Crosbie	Actress (WITS Academy)
July 30	Daniel DiMaggio	Actor (Clarence, American Housewife)
August 11	Rachel Gage	Actress (Walk the Prank)
August 18	Max Charles	Actor (The Neighbors, Harvey Beaks, The Mr. Peabody & Sherman Show, The Lion Guard, The Strain)
August 20	Christopher Paul Richards	Actor (The Kids Are Alright)
August 28	Quvenzhané Wallis	Actress
September 3	Jack Dylan Grazer	Actor (Me, Myself & I)
September 8	Carmen Blanchard	Actress
September 8	Nicolas Cantu	Voice actor (The Amazing World of Gumball, Sofia the First)
September 18	Nina Lu	Actress (Bunk'd)
September 18	Aidan Gallagher	Actor (Nicky, Ricky, Dicky & Dawn)
October 7	Kate Godfrey	Actress (All That, Warped!)
October 10	Maggie Elizabeth Jones	Actress (Ben and Kate)
October 24	Hudson Yang	Actor (Fresh Off the Boat)
October 27	Gavin Lewis	Actor
November 8	Meyrick Murphy	Actress (Legendary Dudas, The Walking Dead)
November 12	Kamaia Fairburn	Actress (Star Falls)
November 21	Elijha Hammill	Canadian voice actor (Ryder on PAW Patrol)
November 23	Olivia Keville	Actress (Splitting Up Together)
December 9	Jackson A. Dunn	Actor (Legendary Dudas)
December 12	Lincoln Melcher	Actor (Nicky, Ricky, Dicky & Dawn, Bunk'd)

== Deaths ==
Date	Name	Age	Notability
January 12	Maurice Gibb	53	Musician/songwriter (Bee Gees)
January 23	Nell Carter	54	Actress, singer (Gimme a Break!)
February 21	Julie Mitchum	88	Actress
February 27	Fred Rogers	74	Mister Rogers of (Mister Rogers' Neighborhood)
March 12	Lynne Thigpen	54	American television/film/stage actress (Bear in the Big Blue House, The District, Where in the World is Carmen Sandiego?, Where in Time is Carmen Sandiego?)
March 30	Michael Jeter	50	Voice actor/stage actor (Sesame Street, Evening Shade, and voice of Nate Horowitz (Eugene's Dad) on Hey Arnold!)
April 30	Lionel Wilson	79	Voice actor (The Aldrich Family, Tom Terrific, The Hector Heathcote Show and first voice of Eustace Bagge on Courage the Cowardly Dog)
May 1	Miss Elizabeth	42	Professional wrestling valet (WWF, WCW)
May 14	Robert Stack	84	Actor (Eliot Ness on The Untouchables)
May 15	June Carter Cash	73	Singer and actress (The Johnny Cash Show)
June 19	Laura Sadler	22	English actress (Grange Hill, Holby City)
June 20	Raymond Serra	66	Actor
July 6	Buddy Ebsen	95	Actor (The Beverly Hillbillies, Barnaby Jones)
July 27	Bob Hope	100	Comedian, host and actor
September 8	Jaclyn Linetsky	17	Canadian voice actress (Mega Babies, What's with Andy?, Caillou)
September 8	Vadim Schneider	17	French-Canadian actor
September 11	John Ritter	54	Actor (Three's Company, 8 Simple Rules for Dating My Teenage Daughter, and voice of Clifford the Big Red Dog)
September 12	Johnny Cash	71	Singer and actor (The Johnny Cash Show)
September 30	Robert Kardashian	59	Lawyer
October 17	Janice Rule	72	Actress (The Fugitive)
October 21	Fred Berry	52	Actor (Freddie "Rerun" Stubbs on What's Happening!!)
October 27	Rod Roddy	66	Announcer (Press Your Luck, Soap, and most famously, The Price Is Right)
November 9	Art Carney	85	Actor (Ed Norton on The Honeymooners)
November 12	Jonathan Brandis	27	Actor (Lucas Wolenczak on seaQuest DSV)
November 12	Penny Singleton	95	Voice actress (Jane Jetson on The Jetsons)
November 14	Gene Anthony Ray	41	Actor (Leroy Johnson on Fame)
November 28	Terry Lester	53	Actor (Jack Abbott on The Young and the Restless, Mason Capwell on Santa Barbara, Royce Keller on As the World Turns)
December 14	Jeanne Crain	78	Actress
December 28	Helen Kleeb	96	Actress (Miss Mamie Baldwin on The Waltons)
December 29	Earl Hindman	61	Actor (Wilson J. Wilson Jr. on Home Improvement)

== Television debuts ==
- Chris O'Dowd – Red Cap

== See also ==
- 2003 in the United States
- List of American films of 2003
