= Channel 11 =

Channel 11 or TV11 may refer to:

- TV11 (Sweden), a Swedish conditional access entertainment channel
- Eleven (Australian TV channel), an Australian free-to-air digital television channel
- Canal Once (Mexico), a Mexican educational broadcast television network assigned virtual channel 11 nationwide
- Channel 11 (Formosa, Argentina)
- Channel 11 (Salta, Argentina), an Argentinian television channel
- CCTV-11, a Chinese television channel
- Señal Colombia, formerly Canal 11, a Colombian national television channel
- Telefe, formerly Canal Once, a state-run network in Argentina
- Chilevisión, formerly Teleonce, a television station in Chile
- BS11, a Japanese television channel
- Repretel 11, a Costa Rican television channel
- Munhwa Broadcasting Corporation, South Korean television and radio network whose flagship station is Channel 11
- DZOE-TV Channel 11, in Metro Manila, Philippines
- ELONCE, a television station in Paraná, Entre Rios, Argentina
- La Tele (Paraguayan TV channel), formerly Hispanoamerica Televisión, a Paraguayan privately television channel
- RBC Televisión, a Peruvian free-to-air television channel
- TDT (TV station), a television station in Tasmania, Australia
- TUTV, a television station in El Salvador
- TVU (Chile), an educational television station in Concepción, Chile
- WPIX, a CW-affiliated television station in New York City, United States that uses the name PIX 11
- KTTV, a Fox-owned television station in Los Angeles, California, United States which also serves as the Fox network’s flagship affiliate
- XHUNAM-TDT, a television station in Mexico City, Mexico

== See also ==
- Television in Lithuania
- Channel 11 branded TV stations in the United States
- Channel 11 virtual TV stations in Canada
- Channel 11 virtual TV stations in the United States

For VHF frequencies covering 198–204 MHz:

- Channel 11 TV stations in Canada
- Channel 11 TV stations in Mexico
- Channel 11 digital TV stations in the United States
- Channel 11 low-power TV stations in the United States
