= Channel 11 virtual TV stations in the United States =

The following television stations operate on virtual channel 11 in the United States:

- K06AV-D in Wolf Point, Montana
- K06IQ-D in Newberry Springs, California
- K06KQ-D in Manhattan, Nevada
- K07BW-D in Westcliffe, Colorado
- K07EQ-D in Ekalaka, Montana
- K08IP-D in Baker, Montana
- K08OY-D in Plains, Montana
- K09IV-D in Plevna, Montana
- K09ZS-D in Gateway, Colorado
- K11CS-D in Rock Island, Washington
- K11FJ-D in Squilchuck St. Park, Washington
- K11LM-D in Thomasville, Colorado
- K11QE-D in Skagway, Alaska
- K11QG-D in Toksook Bay, Alaska
- K11QI-D in Ambler, Alaska
- K11QY-D in Kwethluk, Alaska
- K11UU-D in Pago Pago, American Samoa
- K11WZ-D in Delta Junction, etc., Alaska
- K11XB-D in Long Valley Junction, Utah
- K11XF-D in Woodland, Utah
- K11XG-D in Logan, Utah
- K11XH-D in Blanding/Monticello, Utah
- K11XK-D in Helper, Utah
- K11XP-D in Boise, Idaho
- K11XS-D in Modesto, California
- K12QY-D in Leamington, Utah
- K12RF-D in Healy, etc., Alaska
- K12XC-D in Salina & Redmond, Utah
- K12XG-D in Roosevelt, Utah
- K12XH-D in Price, Utah
- K13FP-D in Wolf Point, Montana
- K13JD-D in Battle Mountain, Nevada
- K13ZI-D in Colorado Springs, Colorado
- K13ZN-D in Heron, Montana
- K13AAM-D in Garrison, etc., Utah
- K14LZ-D in Alexandria, Minnesota
- K14QZ-D in Mount Pleasant, Utah
- K14RO-D in St. George, etc., Utah
- K14RX-D in Ashland, Montana
- K14SD-D in South Lake Tahoe, California
- K15HM-D in Montezuma Creek/Aneth, Utah
- K15KB-D in Squaw Valley, Oregon
- K15KW-D in Philipsburg, Montana
- K15LJ-D in Enterprise, etc., Utah
- K16EM-D in Prineville, etc., Oregon
- K16HI-D in Navajo Mountain, Utah
- K16HJ-D in Oljeto, Utah
- K16HK-D in Mexican Hat, Utah
- K16IZ-D in Eureka, Nevada
- K16MK-D in Laketown, etc., Utah
- K16MM-D in Circleville, Utah
- K16MR-D in Gateway, Colorado
- K16MX-D in Myton, Utah
- K16NB-D in Ely & McGill, Nevada
- K17CA-D in Carson City, Nevada
- K17DG-D in Rural Summit County, Utah
- K17DT-D in Elko, Nevada
- K17JA-D in Basalt, Colorado
- K17JC-D in Orderville, Utah
- K17MI-D in Eads, etc., Colorado
- K17NE-D in Arlee, Montana
- K17NM-D in Scipio, Utah
- K17NU-D in Ruth, Nevada
- K18GT-D in Ryndon, Nevada
- K18JM-D in Northome, Minnesota
- K18ME-D in Richfield, etc., Utah
- K18MJ-D in Nephi, Utah
- K19BY-D in Grangeville, etc., Idaho
- K19HE-D in Bluff, Utah
- K19HZ-D in Jackson, Minnesota
- K19LF-D in Koosharem, Utah
- K19LH-D in Teasdale, etc., Utah
- K19LK-D in Panguitch, Utah
- K19LL-D in Henrieville, Utah
- K19LO-D in Rural Sevier County, Utah
- K19MJ-D in Yerington, Nevada
- K20JV-D in Overton, Nevada
- K20JY-D in Olivia, Minnesota
- K20JZ-D in Green River, Utah
- K20LD-D in Ely, Nevada
- K20MN-D in Red Lake, Minnesota
- K20MR-D in Garfield, etc., Utah
- K20MZ-D in Mayfield, Utah
- K20NK-D in Cedar City, Utah
- K20NQ-D in Orangeville, Utah
- K21CA-D in Plains, Montana
- K21HV-D in Malad, Idaho
- K21IA-D in Waipake, Hawaii
- K21MR-D in Soda Springs, Idaho
- K21NF-D in Roseau, Minnesota
- K21OK-D in Lund & Preston, Nevada
- K22FH-D in Hawthorne, Nevada
- K22JC-D in Silver Springs, Nevada
- K22KU-D in Redwood Falls, Minnesota
- K22KY-D in Poplar, Montana
- K22MI-D in Drummond, Montana
- K22MZ-D in International Falls, Minnesota
- K23FR-D in Winnemucca, Nevada
- K23IV-D in Spring Glen, Utah
- K23JN-D in Virgin, Utah
- K23KR-D in Alton, Utah
- K23NP-D in Thompson Falls, Montana
- K23NW-D in Montrose, Colorado
- K24DD-D in Plevna, Montana
- K24EY-D in Walker Lake, Nevada
- K24HG-D in Cozad, Nebraska
- K24JL-D in Beowawe, Nevada
- K24MH-D in Powers, Oregon
- K24ML-D in Taos, New Mexico
- K25FZ-D in Grand Junction, Colorado
- K25HG-D in Preston, Idaho
- K25KV-D in Huntington, Utah
- K25LE-D in Las Animas, Colorado
- K25OW-D in Marysvale, Utah
- K25PB-D in Rural Iron, etc., Utah
- K25PQ-D in Fallon, Nevada
- K25QI-D in Woody Creek, Colorado
- K26IT-D in Redstone, etc., Colorado
- K26LM-D in Libby, Montana
- K26OC-D in Delta, Oak City, Utah
- K27KD-D in Hatch, Utah
- K27KR-D in Fishlake Resort, Utah
- K27LL-D in Big Falls, Minnesota
- K27OM-D in Valmy, Nevada
- K28GC-D in Gothenburg, Nebraska
- K28OJ-D in Tropic & Cannonville, Utah
- K28OO-D in Fountain Green, Utah
- K28PU-D in Randolph, Utah
- K29CK-D in Carbondale, Colorado
- K29HL-D in Hanalei, etc., Hawaii
- K29IM-D in Samak, Utah
- K29IN-D in Coalville and adjacent area, Utah
- K29IX-D in Caineville, Utah
- K29LT-D in Susanville, etc., California
- K29MA-D in Boulder, Utah
- K29ME-D in Antonito, Colorado
- K29MI-D in Parowan, Enoch, etc., Utah
- K29MJ-D in Rockville, Utah
- K29MR-D in Emery, Utah
- K29MV-D in Spring Glen, Utah
- K29ND-D in Hot Springs, Montana
- K29NK-D in Eureka, Nevada
- K30AL-D in Iola, Kansas
- K30FV-D in Cambridge, Nebraska
- K30JE-D in Lihue, Hawaii
- K30PC-D in Henefer & Echo, Utah
- K30PO-D in Scofield, Utah
- K30QH-D in Burley, etc., Idaho
- K31EF-D in Frost, Minnesota
- K31FN-D in Manti & Ephraim, Utah
- K31IF-D in Hagerman, Idaho
- K31IV-D in Romeo, Colorado
- K31KQ-D in Plains, Montana
- K31OA-D in Antimony, Utah
- K31OF-D in Kanab, Utah
- K31OO-D in Green River, Utah
- K31OS-D in Ferron, Utah
- K31OT-D in Clear Creek, Utah
- K31PK-D in Birchdale, Minnesota
- K32IU-D in Wanship, Utah
- K32KQ-D in Orovada, Nevada
- K32MJ-D in Litchfield, California
- K32MY-D in Heber/Midway, Utah
- K32NA-D in Ridgecrest, California
- K32NW-D in Mina/Luning, Nevada
- K33CP-D in Gold Beach, Oregon
- K33GB-D in Golconda, Nevada
- K33IB-D in Silver Springs, Nevada
- K33JE-D in Modena/Beryl, etc., Utah
- K33OH-D in Ferndale, etc., Montana
- K33OI-D in Hanksville, Utah
- K33OR-D in St. Ignatius, Montana
- K34FP-D in Valmy, Nevada
- K34IS-D in Kilauea, Hawaii
- K34LJ-D in Kabetogama, Minnesota
- K34NZ-D in Fremont, Utah
- K34OT-D in Toquerville & Leeds, Utah
- K34PQ-D in Plains, Montana
- K34PV-D in Cortez, Colorado
- K35IK-D in Duchesne, Utah
- K35JS-D in Lamar, Colorado
- K35MT-D in Port Orford, Oregon
- K35NG-D in Escalante, Utah
- K35NQ-D in Mesa, Colorado
- K36FF-D in Shurz, Nevada
- K36FM-D in Beaver, etc., Utah
- K36FT-D in Santa Clara, etc., Utah
- K36GL-D in Lovelock, Nevada
- K36IJ-D in Anahola, etc., Hawaii
- K36IL-D in Hanna & Tabiona, Utah
- K36IQ-D in Vernal, etc., Utah
- K36LB-D in Cheyenne Wells, Colorado
- K36LE-D in Manila, etc., Utah
- K36OE-D in Garfield County, Utah
- KARE in Minneapolis, Minnesota
- KBWU-LD in Richland, etc., Washington
- KBYU-TV in Provo, Utah
- KCBD in Lubbock, Texas
- KCBY-TV in Coos Bay, Oregon
- KCHF in Santa Fe, New Mexico
- KDIN-TV in Des Moines, Iowa
- KDTP in Holbrook, Arizona
- KELO-TV in Sioux Falls, South Dakota
- KFFX-TV in Pendleton, Oregon
- KFNR in Rawlins, Wyoming
- KGIN in Grand Island, Nebraska
- KHAW-TV in Hilo, Hawaii
- KHET in Honolulu, Hawaii
- KHOU in Houston, Texas
- KKCO in Grand Junction, Colorado
- KKRM-LD in Chico, California
- KKTV in Colorado Springs, Colorado
- KMLU in Columbia, Louisiana
- KMSB in Tucson, Arizona
- KMVT in Twin Falls, Idaho
- KNTV in San Jose, California
- KOED-TV in Tulsa, Oklahoma
- KPLR-TV in St. Louis, Missouri
- KQSD-TV in Lowry, South Dakota
- KRII in Chisholm, Minnesota
- KRXI-TV in Reno, Nevada
- KSNG in Garden City, Kansas
- KSTW in Tacoma, Washington
- KTHV in Little Rock, Arkansas
- KTTV in Los Angeles, California
- KTVA in Anchorage, Alaska
- KTVF in Fairbanks, Alaska
- KTVT in Fort Worth, Texas
- KTWU in Topeka, Kansas
- KUFM-TV in Missoula, Montana
- KVLY-TV in Fargo, North Dakota
- KXMD-TV in Williston, North Dakota
- W11DH-D in Wabasso, Florida
- W11DR-D in Wilmington, North Carolina
- W34DQ-D in Pittsburg, New Hampshire
- W36FE-D in Hanover, New Hampshire
- WBAL-TV in Baltimore, Maryland
- WBKB-TV in Alpena, Michigan
- WDHC-LD in Dickson–Nashville, Tennessee
- WDNZ-LD in Glasgow, Kentucky
- WEBU-LD in Water Valley, Mississippi
- WEKW-TV in Keene, New Hampshire
- WENH-TV in Durham, New Hampshire
- WETV-CD in Murfreesboro, Tennessee
- WEZY-LD in Delphi, Indiana
- WFSU-TV in Tallahassee, Florida
- WGSI-CD in Murrells Inlet, South Carolina
- WHAS-TV in Louisville, Kentucky
- WINK-TV in Fort Myers, Florida
- WJDP-LD in Pigeon Forge, Tennessee
- WJHL-TV in Johnson City, Tennessee
- WLED-TV in Littleton, New Hampshire
- WLII-DT in Caguas, Puerto Rico
- WLJT in Lexington, Tennessee
- WLUK-TV in Green Bay, Wisconsin
- WOME-LD in Orlando, Florida
- WPHJ-LD in Baxley, Georgia
- WPIX in New York, New York
- WPNY-LD in Utica, etc., New York
- WPXI in Pittsburgh, Pennsylvania
- WTOC-TV in Savannah, Georgia
- WTOK-TV in Meridian, Mississippi
- WTOL in Toledo, Ohio
- WTTW in Chicago, Illinois
- WTVD in Durham, North Carolina
- WTXI-LD in Miami, Florida
- WTZT-CD in Athens, Alabama
- WVAH-TV in Charleston, West Virginia
- WXIA-TV in Atlanta, Georgia

The following stations, which are no longer licensed, formerly operated on virtual channel 11 in the United States:

- K04GP-D in Alyeska, Alaska
- K08HN-D in Aspen, Colorado
- K08LW-D in Kenai/Soldotna, Alaska
- K11BI-D in Entiat, Washington
- K11QN-D in Aniak, Alaska
- K11RQ-D in Chignik Lake, Alaska
- K11VP-D in Homer-Seldovia, Alaska
- K15AG-D in Ninilchik, Alaska
- K18MU-D in Round Mountain, Nevada
- K26EH-D in Austin, Nevada
- K29KH-D in Kasilof, Alaska
- K36IN-D in Fruitland, etc., Utah
- K41HH-D in Austin, Nevada
- K48IJ-D in Preston, Idaho
- K49EA-D in Crowley Lake, California
- K50MO-D in Palmer, Alaska
- KSWT in Yuma, Arizona
- W40AN-D in Escanaba, Michigan
- WMTO-LD in Manteo, North Carolina
