= Channel 11 digital TV stations in the United States =

The following television stations broadcast on digital channel 11 in the United States:

- K10OA-D in Terrace Lakes, Idaho
- K11AT-D in Gunnison, Colorado, on virtual channel 7
- K11BD-D in Leadore, Idaho
- K11BM-D in Methow, Washington
- K11BX-D in Sutherlin, Oregon
- K11CN-D in Caliente, Nevada
- K11CP-D in Fish Creek, Idaho
- K11CQ-D in Cedar City, Utah, on virtual channel 4, which rebroadcasts KTVX
- K11CS-D in Rock Island, Washington
- K11DL-D in Juliaetta, Idaho
- K11ED-D in Ruth, Nevada
- K11EE-D in Ely & McGill, Nevada
- K11EV-D in Grants, etc., New Mexico
- K11EZ-D in Cashmere, Washington
- K11FF-D in Superior, Montana
- K11FJ-D in Squilchuck St. Park, Washington
- K11FQ-D in Thompson Falls, Montana
- K11GH-D in Tri Cities, etc., Oregon
- K11GT-D in Eugene, Oregon
- K11GX-D in Whitewater, Montana
- K11HE-D in Jordan, etc., Montana
- K11HM-D in Bonners Ferry, Idaho
- K11HO-D in Polson, Montana
- K11IA-D in Glasgow, Montana
- K11IH-D in Malta, Montana
- K11IL-D in Bitterroot Range, etc., Montana
- K11IV-D in Pioche, Nevada
- K11IY-D in Battle Mountain, Nevada
- K11JP-D in Plains-Paradise, Montana
- K11KE-D in Woods Bay, Montana
- K11KI-D in Dorena, etc., Oregon
- K11KO-D in Kamiah, Idaho
- K11KP-D in Troy, Montana
- K11LA-D in Basin, Montana
- K11LC-D in Prescott, Arizona, on virtual channel 3, which rebroadcasts KTVK
- K11LM-D in Thomasville, Colorado
- K11LP-D in Cortez, Colorado
- K11MP-D in White Sulphur Springs, Montana
- K11OO-D in Pine Valley, etc., Utah
- K11OW-D in Ursine, Nevada
- K11PB-D in Cambridge, Idaho
- K11PP-D in Dingle, etc., Idaho
- K11PS-D in Collbran, Colorado
- K11QE-D in Skagway, Alaska
- K11QG-D in Toksook Bay, Alaska
- K11QI-D in Ambler, Alaska
- K11QQ-D in Hildale, etc., Utah
- K11QY-D in Kwethluk, Alaska
- K11RN-D in Douglas, Wyoming
- K11RX-D in Big Arm, Montana
- K11SZ-D in Oakridge, Oregon
- K11TJ-D in Sargents, Colorado, on virtual channel 8, which rebroadcasts K06HN-D
- K11TY-D in Salmon, Idaho
- K11UN-D in Coolin, Idaho
- K11UU-D in Pago Pago, American Samoa
- K11UW-D in Akron, Colorado, on virtual channel 3, which rebroadcasts KCDO-TV
- K11VI-D in Elkton, Oregon
- K11VY-D in Toquerville, Utah, on virtual channel 2, which rebroadcasts KUTV
- K11WF-D in Mink Creek, Idaho, on virtual channel 4, which rebroadcasts KTVX
- K11WK-D in Stanford, Montana
- K11WM-D in Townsend, Montana
- K11WQ-D in West Knees, Montana
- K11WR-D in Council, Idaho
- K11WT-D in McCall, Idaho
- K11WY-D in Coulee City, Washington
- K11WZ-D in Delta Junction, etc., Alaska
- K11XB-D in Long Valley Junction, Utah
- K11XC-D in Salina & Redmond, Utah
- K11XD-D in Rural Juab, etc., Utah
- K11XE-D in Marysvale, Utah
- K11XF-D in Woodland, Utah
- K11XG-D in Logan, Utah
- K11XH-D in Blanding/Monticello, Utah
- K11XI-D in Beaver etc., Utah
- K11XK-D in Helper, Utah
- K11XL-D in Roosevelt, etc., Utah, on virtual channel 9, which rebroadcasts KUEN
- K11XM-D in East Price, Utah, on virtual channel 9, which rebroadcasts KUEN
- K11XP-D in Boise, Idaho
- K11XS-D in Modesto, California
- K11XU-D in El Centro, California
- K21KJ-D in Mineral Wells, Texas, on virtual channel 40
- KCBA in Salinas, California
- KCBD in Lubbock, Texas
- KCBY-TV in Coos Bay, Oregon
- KDIN-TV in Des Moines, Iowa
- KDTP in Holbrook, Arizona, on virtual channel 11
- KEET in Eureka, California
- KELO-TV in Sioux Falls, South Dakota
- KFFX-TV in Pendleton, Oregon
- KFVS-TV in Cape Girardeau, Missouri
- KGIN in Grand Island, Nebraska
- KGMC in Merced, California
- KHAW-TV in Hilo, Hawaii
- KHET in Honolulu, Hawaii
- KHOU in Houston, Texas, on virtual channel 11
- KJST-LD in McAllen, Texas
- KJUD in Juneau, Alaska
- KKRM-LD in Chico, California
- KLST in San Angelo, Texas
- KLVX in Las Vegas, Nevada
- KMLU in Columbia, Louisiana
- KMVT in Twin Falls, Idaho
- KNSO in Merced, California
- KOAB-TV in Bend, Oregon
- KOED-TV in Tulsa, Oklahoma
- KPJC-LD in San Francisco, California, on virtual channel 24, which rebroadcasts KAAP-LD
- KQCK in Cheyenne, Wyoming, on virtual channel 33
- KQSD-TV in Lowry, South Dakota
- KRII in Chisholm, Minnesota
- KSBK-LD in Colorado Springs, Colorado
- KSNG in Garden City, Kansas
- KSTW in Tacoma, Washington, on virtual channel 11
- KSWO-TV in Lawton, Oklahoma
- KTTV in Los Angeles, California, on virtual channel 11
- KTVF in Fairbanks, Alaska
- KTVN in Reno, Nevada
- KTWU in Topeka, Kansas
- KUFM-TV in Missoula, Montana
- KULR-TV in Billings, Montana
- KUVN-CD in Fort Worth, Texas, on virtual channel 23, which rebroadcasts KUVN-DT
- KVCT in Victoria, Texas
- KVHC-LD in Kerrville, Texas
- KWSE in Williston, North Dakota
- KWVT-LD in Salem, Oregon, on virtual channel 17, which rebroadcasts KLSM-LD
- W11AJ-D in Franklin, North Carolina
- W11AN-D in Bryson City, North Carolina
- W11DH-D in Wabasso, Florida
- W11DM-D in Collegedale, Tennessee
- W11DR-D in Wilmington, North Carolina
- WBKB-TV in Alpena, Michigan
- WBRE-TV in Wilkes-Barre, Pennsylvania
- WCIX in Springfield, Illinois
- WDFL-LD in Miami, Florida, on virtual channel 18
- WDNZ-LD in Glasgow, Kentucky
- WENH-TV in Durham, New Hampshire, on virtual channel 11
- WESH in Daytona Beach, Florida, an ATSC 3.0 station, on virtual channel 2
- WGVU-TV in Grand Rapids, Michigan
- WHAS-TV in Louisville, Kentucky
- WISC-TV in Madison, Wisconsin
- WJDP-LD in Pigeon Forge, Tennessee
- WJKF-CD in Jacksonville, Florida
- WJZ-TV in Baltimore, Maryland, on virtual channel 13
- WLFI-TV in Lafayette, Indiana, on virtual channel 18
- WLII-DT in Caguas, Puerto Rico, on virtual channel 11
- WNIB-LD in Rochester, New York
- WPIX in New York, New York, on virtual channel 11
- WPKD-TV in Jeannette, Pennsylvania
- WPNY-LD in Utica, etc., New York
- WSPA-TV in Spartanburg, South Carolina, on virtual channel 7
- WTNC-LD in Durham, North Carolina, on virtual channel 26, which rebroadcasts WUVC-DT
- WTOL in Toledo, Ohio
- WTVA in Tupelo, Mississippi
- WTVM in Columbus, Georgia
- WTZT-CD in Athens, Alabama
- WUEO-LD in Macon, Georgia, on virtual channel 49
- WVTT-CD in Olean, New York
- WWLP in Springfield, Massachusetts
- WYCH-LD in Rockford, Illinois
- WYCW in Asheville, North Carolina, uses WSPA-TV's spectrum, on virtual channel 62
- WYES-TV in New Orleans, Louisiana

The following station, which is no longer licensed, formerly broadcast on digital channel 11 in the United States:

- K11BI-D in Entiat, Washington
- K11MU-D in Paradise Valley, Nevada
- K11QN-D in Aniak, Alaska
- K11RQ-D in Chignik Lake, Alaska
- K11VP-D in Homer-Seldovia, Alaska
- K11XT-D in Mariposa, California
- KSWT in Yuma, Arizona
- W11AY-D in St John Plantation, Maine
- WETV-CD in Murfreesboro, Tennessee
- WMTO-LD in Manteo, North Carolina
