= Channel 38 =

Channel 38 refers to several television stations:

== Canada ==
The following television stations formerly broadcast on digital or analog channel 38 (UHF frequencies covering 614-620 MHz) in Canada:

- CHCH-TV-5 in Sault Ste. Marie, Ontario
- CIMT-DT-5 in Saint-Urbain, Quebec
- CJCO-DT in Calgary, Alberta

The following television stations operate on virtual channel 38 in Canada:

- CJCO-DT in Calgary, Alberta

=== Defunct ===
- CHNB-TV-11 in Woodstock, New Brunswick

== Mexico ==
The following television stations operate on virtual channel 38 in Mexico:

- XHMEE-TDT in Mexicali, Baja California

== See also ==
- Channel 38 digital TV stations in the United States
- Channel 38 virtual TV stations in the United States
- Channel 38 low-power TV stations in the United States
