= A Secret Life =

A Secret Life may refer to:

- A Secret Life (film), a 1999 American film
- A Secret Life (album), 1995, by Marianne Faithfull
- A Secret Life (book), 2011,
- "A Secret Life" (Doctors), a 2004 television episode

== See also ==
- Secret Life (disambiguation)
