= WGNS =

Coordinates: 35°50′26″N 86°23′27″W

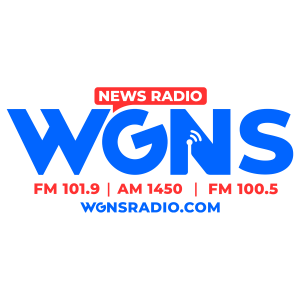
- Murfreesboro, Tennessee; United States
- Broadcast area: Rutherford County; Middle Tennessee
- Frequency: 1450 kHz
- Branding: News Radio WGNS

Programming
- Format: Talk radio
- Affiliations: Fox News Radio; Premiere Networks; Westwood One; Blue Raider Network; MTSU

Ownership
- Owner: The Rutherford Group, Inc.

History
- First air date: December 31, 1946; 79 years ago
- Call sign meaning: Good Neighbor Station

Technical information
- Licensing authority: FCC
- Facility ID: 66335
- Class: C
- Power: 1,000 watts unlimited
- Translators: 100.5 W263AI (Murfreesboro); 101.9 W270AF (Murfreesboro)

Links
- Public license information: Public file; LMS
- Webcast: Listen Live
- Website: wgnsradio.com

WGNS (1450 AM) is a radio station based in Murfreesboro, Tennessee, United States. The call letters are an acronym representing the phrase, "Good Neighbor Station". The station covers Murfreesboro, Tennessee proper as well as the surrounding counties. WGNS also operated class A television station WETV-CD channel 11, which simulcast the audio from WGNS and local talk programming until the cancellation of its license on August 3, 2021. The station also has one FM translator at 101.9 FM and another at 100.5 FM, which are both licensed to Murfreesboro.

== History ==
=== Early years ===
WGNS was founded by Cecil Elrod Jr. The station signed on the air at 10:00 p.m. Central time on December 31, 1946, with the first full day of broadcast taking place at WGNS on January 1, 1947. The first program broadcast on the station was an introductory program entitled This is WGNS, followed by a New Year's program from the Mutual Broadcasting System. Their first sports program was the broadcast of the 1947 Cotton Bowl that originated from Dallas, Texas. Throughout its history, the station never changed its callsign or its frequency. WGNS has been carrying high school football and basketball games, as well as Middle Tennessee Blue Raiders sporting events, since 1947.

=== The 1980s and 90s ===
In 1981, WGNS began broadcasting Atlanta Braves baseball broadcasts provided by the Atlanta Braves Radio Network. Bart Walker purchased the station in 1984, and he has owned the station ever since.

WGNS was broadcasting a rock n’ roll format until 1990, but news and sports also occupied the program schedule. MTSU Sports was dropped in favor of university of Tennessee Volunteers football and basketball during the 1990s. WGNS switched to a news/talk format in 1990.

=== 2000s ===
The station's original self-supporting tower, which was 328 feet (100 m) tall and dated back to the World War II-era, was destroyed during a severe thunderstorm on April 15, 2001. The tower was rebuilt by July 14, 2001, and is the tallest structure of any kind in Murfreesboro.

MTSU sports returned to the station in 2005.

On the morning of March 1, 2007, WGNS began simulcasting its signal over two FM translators, W270AF at 101.9 MHz and W263AI at 100.5 MHz. WGNS was the first AM radio station in the United States to broadcast with this new type of FM translator. WRHI in Rock Hill, South Carolina became the second AM broadcaster in the nation to begin this service. Their first broadcast was on the next day (March 2, 2007).

=== 2020s ===
In November 2021, it was announced that WGNS will be moving one of its FM translators to Smyrna, TN. On January 1, 2022, WGNS expanded its coverage to north Rutherford County with 100.5 MHz broadcasting in the city of Smyrna while 101.9 FM and 1450 AM remained broadcasting in Murfreesboro.

== See also ==
- WETV-CD
