= KBJR-TV =

Television station in Superior, Wisconsin

KBJR-TV and KRII

KBJR-TV: Superior, Wisconsin–Duluth, Minnesota; KRII: Chisholm–Hibbing, Minnesota; United States
- Channels for KBJR-TV: Digital: 19 (UHF); Virtual: 6
- Channels for KRII: Digital: 11 (VHF); Virtual: 11
- Branding: 6.1/11.1: KBJR 6; 6.2/11.2: CBS 3 Duluth; 6.3/11.3: My 9; Northern News Now (newscasts)

Programming
- Affiliations: 6.1/11.1: NBC; 6.2/11.2: CBS; 6.3/11.3: North Star SEN/MyNetworkTV

Ownership
- Owner: Gray Media; (Gray Television Licensee, LLC)
- Sister stations: KDLH

History
- First air date: KBJR-TV: March 1, 1954; KRII: November 27, 2002
- Former call signs: KBJR-TV: WDSM-TV (1954–1974)
- Former channel number: KBJR-TV: Analog: 6 (VHF, 1954–2009); KRII: Analog: 11 (VHF, 2002–2009)
- Former affiliations: KBJR-TV: CBS (1954–1955); ABC (secondary, 1954–1966); UPN (6.2, 2002–2006); MyNetworkTV (6.2, 2006−2016)
- Call sign meaning: KBJR-TV: Bob, John, Rich (former station owner / RJR Communications); KRII: Range II (11) (former branding)

Technical information
- Licensing authority: FCC
- Facility ID: KBJR-TV: 33658; KRII: 82698
- ERP: KBJR-TV: 384 kW; KRII: 63 kW
- HAAT: KBJR-TV: 311.9 m (1,023 ft); KRII: 200.4 m (657 ft)
- Transmitter coordinates: KBJR-TV: 46°47′21.1″N 92°6′51.4″W; KRII: 47°51′39″N 92°56′46.6″W
- Translator: see § KRII translators

Links
- Public license information: KBJR-TV: Public file; LMS; KRII: Public file; LMS
- Website: northernnewsnow.com

KBJR-TV (channel 6) in Superior, Wisconsin, and KRII (channel 11) in Chisholm, Minnesota, are television stations serving as the NBC and CBS affiliates for northeast Minnesota, northwest Wisconsin, and the Duluth, Minnesota, area. Owned by Gray Media, they share common ownership with CW+ affiliate KDLH (channel 3). The stations share studios on South Lake Avenue in Canal Park, downtown Duluth; KBJR-TV's transmitter is located west of downtown in Hilltop Park.

KRII, formerly branded as Range 11, operates as a semi-satellite and has a news bureau and advertising sales office on East Howard Street in Hibbing. KRII serves the northern portion of the market, including the Iron Range area, Grand Rapids and International Falls. This station simulcasts KBJR except during commercials and station identifications. KRII's transmitter is located in Linden Grove Township; master control and most internal operations are based at KBJR's facilities in Duluth. It also acts as a full-power translator station of all of the various channels and subchannels of KBJR.

KBJR operates the area's CBS affiliate on a second digital subchannel, known on-air as CBS 3 in reference to the Twin Ports' longtime CBS affiliate, KDLH, and because it is carried on Charter Spectrum cable channel 3. KDLH was formerly operated by KBJR under a shared services agreement (SSA), wound down following the purchase of KBJR and KDLH by Quincy and SagamoreHill Broadcasting respectively. KBJR also operates a MyNetworkTV-affiliated third subchannel, branded as My 9 (also in reference to its cable position) which airs programming from Gray's North Star Sports and Entertainment Network outside of the MyNetworkTV lineup.

== History ==
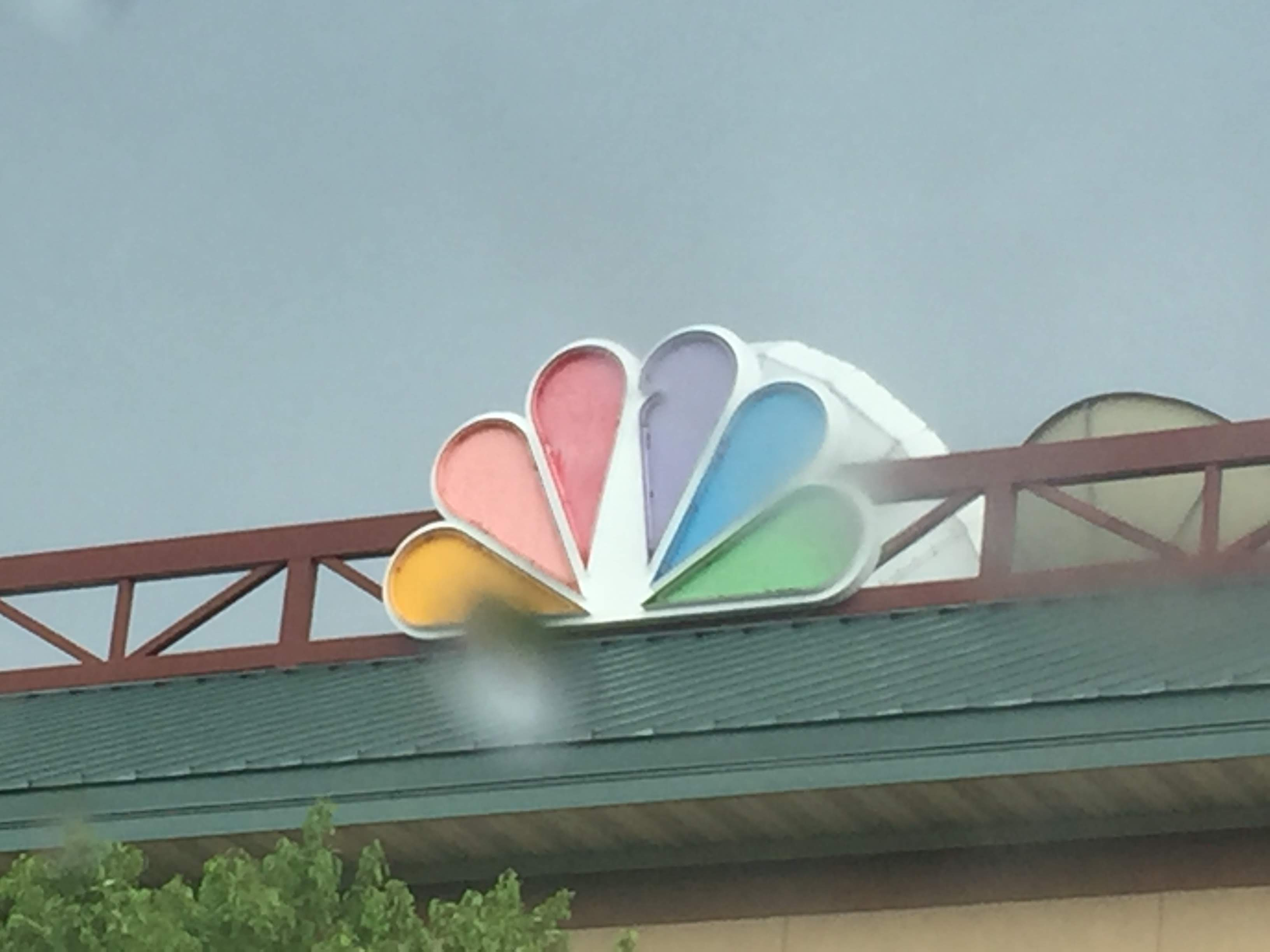
NBC logo atop the exterior of KBJR-TV's studios in Duluth, Minnesota.

The station began on March 1, 1954, as WDSM-TV, and was affiliated with CBS. It was owned by Ridder Newspapers, owner of the Duluth Herald (now part of the Duluth News Tribune), along with WDSM radio (710 AM). WDSM was the first VHF television station in Duluth, signing on days before KDAL-TV (now KDLH). In October 1955, the station switched affiliations with KDAL and became an NBC affiliate. It began local color broadcasts in November 1965. It also aired some ABC programs, sharing them with KDAL, until WDIO-TV signed-on in 1966.

Ridder merged with Knight Newspapers in 1974 to form Knight Ridder. However, the merged company was not allowed to keep the WDSM stations. It was grandfathered under Federal Communications Commission (FCC) rules forbidding common ownership of newspapers and broadcasting outlets. The FCC considered the Knight-Ridder merger to be an ownership change, and as a result, the WDSM stations lost their grandfathered protection. The television station was spun off to RJR Communications, a locally based group, in the fall of that year. On November 13, the call letters were changed to the current KBJR-TV. Channel 6 is one of the few stations in the country whose call sign begins with "K" despite being licensed to a city east of the Mississippi River. However, its studios have long been located in Duluth.

Granite Broadcasting acquired KBJR at the end of October 1988, making it one of the company's earliest acquisitions. On December 14, 1997, KBJR's studios were destroyed in a fire late that evening. It left the air temporarily but managed to get back on-the-air the next morning cobbling together a makeshift workspace at its transmitter building after plastering a technical difficulties slide. Two days later, the news operation moved in with PBS member station WDSE and sales and business operations moved to open office space at the U.S. Bank building in Downtown Duluth while master control remained at the transmitter. In April 1999, a spring ice storm swept through Duluth. The heavy accumulation of ice severely damaged KBJR's transmitting tower and, as the melting ice started falling off the tower, large ice chunks broke through the roof of the transmitter building flooding it with water and damaging much of the equipment inside. Master control operations were moved again using a temporary transmitter on WDIO's tower while KBJR's own tower and transmitter were replaced. In June 1999, it relocated to its current location in Canal Park.

In March 2005, the Malara Broadcast Group purchased KDLH from New Vision Television and outsourced most of that station's functions to KBJR. Under this agreement, KDLH laid off most of its staff, and KBJR began to handle nearly all of channel 3's operations. Filings with the FCC showed Malara could operate KDLH with as few as two people on the payroll.

On January 24, 2006, The WB and UPN announced that they would cease broadcasting and merge. The new combined network would be called The CW. The letters would represent the first initial of its corporate parents, CBS (the parent company of UPN) and the Warner Bros. unit of Time Warner. On February 22, News Corporation announced that it would start up another new broadcast television network called MyNetworkTV. This new network, which would be sister to Fox, would be operated by Fox Television Stations and its syndication division Twentieth Television. MyNetworkTV was created to give UPN and WB stations, not mentioned as becoming CW affiliates, another option besides becoming independent. It was also created to compete with that network. KDLH operated the area's cable-only WB affiliate, "KWBD", which was part of The WB 100+. Area access to UPN was offered in two ways. KBJR operated an affiliate known on-air as "Northland's UPN" and later "UPN 9" (based on its Charter channel location) on its second digital subchannel. This was also available over-the-air in Ashland, Wisconsin, on WAST-LP, which was a low-power analog semi-satellite of the digital subchannel. WAST was owned by a separate entity from KBJR.

On April 11, 2008, a blizzard swept through the area. Winds over 50 mph (80 km/h), and heavy, wet snow caused power outages in Duluth which caused KBJR, KDLH, and WDIO to lose their signals at times. Weekday morning anchor Dan Hanger was on the air live from 5 to 9 a.m. At times, he and meteorologist Shannon Murphy were in the dark but were able to broadcast audio. By late morning when KBJR returned to the air, Barbara Reyelts and George Kessler anchored nonstop using a newsroom setup with one microphone and one camera. By noon, KDLH anchor Pat Kelly was reporting from outside the studios. Also, any phone interviews were done through a cell phone by holding a microphone up to the speaker of the cell phone.

At some point in time, it was announced that KDLH would carry The CW on a new second digital subchannel as part of The CW Plus which would be simulcasted on "KWBD". That service would be a similar operation to The WB 100+. It was later announced that "UPN 9" would become an independent station known as "Northland's 9" complete with new logo and graphics. In March 2006, it was made public that KBJR-DT2 would become an affiliate of MyNetworkTV. In July ahead of the launch of the network, "Northland 9" became known as "My 9" while WAST was shut down in August. MyNetworkTV began broadcasting on September 5 while "KWBD" began broadcasting The CW on September 18. On that date, that station officially started using the KDLH-DT2 call sign. On April 5, 2010, KBJR and KRII introduced a new logo with a joint branding of "KBJR 6 & Range 11".

=== KRII history ===
KRII signed-on for the first time on November 27, 2002 as a semi-satellite of KBJR. It was originally licensed to International Falls but was changed to Chisholm, which is closer to Duluth, before signing on. It was granted an original construction permit after the FCC finalized the DTV allotment plan on April 21, 1997. As a result, it did not receive a companion channel for a digital television station. Instead on January 6, 2009, over a month before the end of the digital television conversion period for full-service stations, KRII turned off its analog signal and turned on its digital signal (an action called a "flash-cut"). After shutting off analog broadcasts, KRII began multi-casting programming on digital subchannels. Its news bureau is home to a reporter who contributes Iron Range coverage to the KBJR and KDLH newscasts.

=== Sale to Quincy, then Gray ===
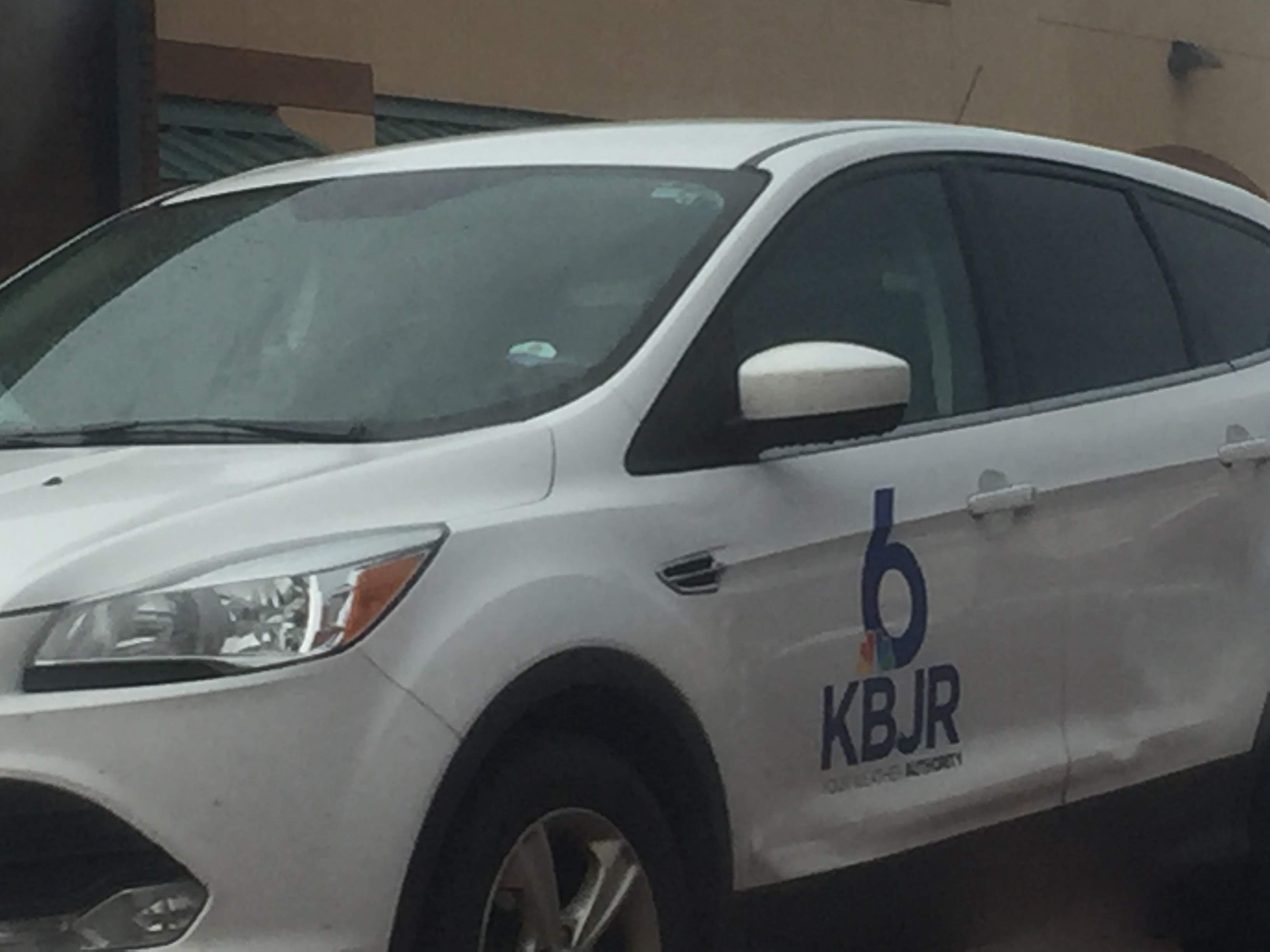
A car operated by KBJR-TV parked in the exterior of the studio.

On February 11, 2014, Quincy Media announced that it would purchase KBJR-TV and its satellite KRII, along with WEEK-TV in Peoria, Illinois, and WBNG-TV in Binghamton, New York, from Granite (the deal at the time also included the outright purchase of WPTA in Fort Wayne, Indiana, from the Malara Broadcast Group). The license for Malara-owned KDLH was originally planned to be sold to SagamoreHill Broadcasting, with KBJR continuing to operate KDLH through a shared services agreement; that November, SagamoreHill was dropped from the deal, and KDLH would remain with Malara, though Quincy and KBJR would continue to provide services.

In July 2015, the deal was reworked yet again; it returned to its previous structure, with SagamoreHill acquiring KDLH, but with the SSA wound down within nine months of the deal's closure—after which CBS programming would be moved to a subchannel of KBJR, and KDLH would operate independently of KBJR and solely carry CW programming. In this form, the deal was completed on November 2, 2015.

These changes took effect on-air on August 1, 2016, with the launch of KBJR's new "CBS 3" subchannel (named in reference to its continued carriage on Charter cable channel 3) and re-launched news programming.

Quincy acquired KDLH in 2018, asserting that the station was 5th in the market in November 2017 sweeps numbers (thus satisfying the requirement for duopolies to not involve two of the top four stations in a market).

On February 1, 2021, Gray Television announced its intent to purchase Quincy Media for $925 million. The acquisition was completed on August 2, making KBJR and KDLH sisters to Gray stations in nearby markets, including CBS/Fox affiliates KEYC-TV in Mankato and WSAW-TV/WZAW-LD in Wausau, and NBC affiliates WLUC-TV in Marquette and WEAU in Eau Claire, while separating from their former Wisconsin sister stations which were divested in order to complete the purchase.

=== Christmas City of the North Parade ===
Each November on the Friday before Thanksgiving, KBJR puts on a parade in downtown Duluth called the Christmas City of the North Parade. It is broadcast live on KBJR and streamed live on its website. In recent years, the parade also has been replayed numerous times in the weeks and days before Christmas. According to this station, the parade dates back to 1958 when KBJR (then WDSM) started the event as a way to kick off the holiday shopping season in the area.

It has been held every year since except in 1963 when the event was canceled following the assassination of President John F. Kennedy; the 2020 edition was held as a no-spectator event due to the COVID-19 pandemic. In the early 1960s, the station commissioned Merv Griffin to produce a song especially for the parade. The "Christmas City Song" has been used for the parade every year and also has been the closing music for all KBJR newscasts from Thanksgiving until Christmas.

== News operation ==
While operating its own news department, KDLH was the last of the big three stations in Duluth to have a weekday 5 p.m. broadcast. It aired Judge Judy in the time slot instead. In 2004, it debuted a 5 p.m. show that featured anchor Amy Rutledge and meteorologist Phil Johnson. This was replaced along with its 6 o'clock show with the current one at 5:30 when KDLH merged with KBJR in March 2005. Jeopardy! has since reclaimed the 5 o'clock spot on that channel and the CBS Evening News airs at 6. After the KDLH buyout, that station had its news department closed and merged with KBJR. To maintain a separate identity, there were some personalities on this channel that were also seen on KDLH. However, due to KBJR's existing newscasts not all of this station's personnel were seen on that station. More recently, the news teams of both stations have been downsized.

KDLH's Northland's NewsCenter at 5:30 had been anchored by Pat Kelly, who was the only news team member remaining after the KDLH sellout. The station aired an abbreviated late-night newscast at 10 p.m., Northland's NewsCenter Express, as a lead-in to Seinfeld reruns to fill the rest of the timeslot. After thirteen months of mediocre ratings, KDLH changed its 10 o'clock show to the traditional 35 minutes and re-branded it to Northland's NewsCenter Tonight.

Until its shutdown in late-December 2008, KBJR offered NBC Weather Plus with local inserts on a third digital subchannel and Charter digital channel 391. When the national service ended, KBJR-DT3 was re-branded as NBC Plus, which featured a computer-updated loop of regional satellite/radar images, current weather conditions and temperatures, and daily forecasts. A new fourth digital subchannel was created featuring news and weather updated and the "L-Bar" that is a remnant of the former NBC Weather Plus service. This was known on-air as Northand's NewsCenter Now.

KBJR, KRII, and KDLH began broadcasting their local newscasts in 16:9 widescreen on May 4, 2009. They were the first television stations in the market to do so. Although not true high definition, the format matches the ratio of HD television screens. As of November, KDLH began to brand its separate weeknight shows as KDLH 3 News which air from a secondary set. On January 11, 2010, KDLH starting airing the area's only weeknight 6:30 newscast.

On August 3, 2016, with the move of KDLH's CBS programming to KBJR-DT2, its news operation was expanded with the introduction of new 6 p.m. and 10 p.m. newscasts, and a new morning newscast the next day. These newscasts competed directly with those shown on KBJR-TV; previously, KDLH deferred these timeslots to KBJR as part of the shared news operation. While both KBJR 6 and CBS 3's news operations shared footage and some reporters, the two subchannels produced separate newscasts with their own distinct anchors, production staff, and studios.

On March 23, 2020, KBJR-DT2 added a half-hour weeknight newscast at 5 p.m. and according to NorthPine, it marked the first time since 2005 that Duluth has had three 5 p.m. newscasts as KDLH used to air one until 2005 when it merged its news department with KBJR's and consolidated its newscasts at 5 and 6 p.m. with one single early-evening newscast at 5:30 p.m., as a result of the new newscast, Jeopardy! moved back to its original time slot at 4:30 p.m. and 25 Words or Less moved to noon to replace a paid program.

On September 26, 2022, KBJR and KBJR-DT2 merged their news departments once again, under the branding Northern News Now; its morning and 10 p.m. newscasts are simulcast by both the NBC and CBS subchannels, while the 5 and 6 p.m. newscasts would be exclusive to KBJR, and new 4 and 6:30 p.m. newscasts became exclusive to KBJR-DT2. The station argued that the redundant resources of having two news departments could be better-utilized to provide a wider variety of coverage, and newscasts in additional timeslots.

== Technical information ==
=== Subchannels ===
The stations' signals are multiplexed:

Subchannels of KBJR-TV and KRII
Channel		Res.	Short name		Programming
KBJR-TV	KRII	Res.	KBJR-TV	KRII	Programming
6.1	11.1	1080i	KBJRNBC	KRIINBC	NBC
6.2	11.2	1080i	KBJRCBS	KRIICBS	CBS
6.3	11.3	720p	KBJRMY	KRIIMY	North Star SEN & MNTV

=== Analog-to-digital conversion ===
KBJR-TV ended regular programming on its analog signal, over VHF channel 6, on February 17, 2009, to conclude the federally mandated transition from analog to digital television. The station's digital signal remained on its pre-transition UHF channel 19, using virtual channel 6.

=== KRII translators ===
In addition to the main signal, KRII is rebroadcast on several translators in northern Minnesota.

- K27LL-D Big Falls
- K31PK-D Birchdale
- K22MZ-D International Falls
- K34LJ-D Kabetogama
- K18JM-D Northome
- K20MN-D Red Lake

== See also ==
- Channel 3 branded TV stations in the United States
- Channel 6 virtual TV stations in the United States
- Channel 9 branded TV stations in the United States
- Channel 11 digital TV stations in the United States
- Channel 11 virtual TV stations in the United States
- Channel 19 digital TV stations in the United States
