= Channel 38 low-power TV stations in the United States =

The following low-power television stations broadcast on digital or analog channel 38 in the United States:

- K38IM in Albuquerque, New Mexico, to move to channel 34

The following stations, which are no longer licensed, formerly broadcast on digital or analog channel 38:

- K38BU-D in Gruver, Texas
- K38EL in Fairbanks, Alaska
- K38FO-D in Carbondale, Colorado
- K38GP in Green River, Utah
- K38HU in Kailua-Kona, Hawaii
- K38HV in Samak, Utah
- K38IO in De Leon, Texas
- K38IT in Stemilt, etc., Washington
- K38JD in Durango, Colorado
- K38KZ-D in Bovina, etc., Texas
- K38LK-D in Jacks Cabin, Colorado
- K38OF-D in Crowley, Louisiana
- K38OR-D in Jonesboro, Arkansas
- KCJY-LP in Twin Falls, Idaho
- KHOH-LP in Hilo, Hawaii
- KJCP-LP in Pago Pago, American Samoa
- KNDX-LD in Dickinson, North Dakota
- KPAL-LP in Palmdale, California
- KVFW-LD in Fort Worth, Texas
- KVSW-LP in Winslow, Arizona
- KXND-LD in Williston, North Dakota
- KZMD-LD in Lufkin, Texas
- W38BN in Salisbury, Maryland
- W38CB in Littleton, New Hampshire
- W38EM-D in Albany, Georgia
- W38FI-D in Laurel, Mississippi
- WALM-LD in Sebring, Florida
- WBMG-LD in Moody, Alabama
- WGCW-LP in Savannah, Georgia
- WHCT-LP in Hartford, Connecticut
