= Bart Walker III =

American radio personality and broadcast owner

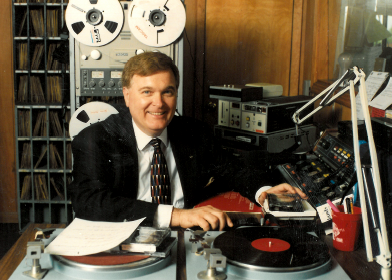
Bart Walker in the 1980s at WGNS

Bart Walker III (born July 15, 1944 in Knoxville, TN) is an American radio personality and broadcast owner from Tennessee. He is the CEO of WGNS Radio in Murfreesboro, Tennessee. Murfreesboro is listed as the tenth fastest growing city in the United States.

== Career ==
In 1957, Walker built a low-power AM radio station when he was in the seventh grade. Belle Meade Theater Manager E. J. Jordan invited the youngster to interview greats like Fess Parker, Pat Boone, Diane Baker, Guy Lombardo and others who would come to the theater and sign the "Wall of Fame" in Nashville, TN.

That same year, popular top 40 Nashville WKDA DJ Ronn Terrell (Terrell Metheny, now retired in Arkansas) encouraged Walker by allowing him to pull news from the teletype on Friday nights, write news stories, and occasionally cover a story that was in the downtown area.

During the summer of 1958 (just before Walker's freshman high school year), William O. (Bill) Barry gave him his first break with a Saturday night job on WFMB (105.9 MHz in Nashville).

At that time FM was so new that the Nashville Public Library would check-out Granco table radios, just like books. That allowed listeners to hear the public library's classical music broadcasts that were on Nashville's WFMB. It was the only FM station on-the-air in Nashville at that time. Many years later, the Public Library of Nashville received a license for its own FM radio station (WPLN). Now WPLN is 100,000 watts and a non-profit known as "Nashville Public Radio" that is no longer a part of the library.

'WLAC-FM from L&C Observation Deck'

Life and Casualty Insurance Company purchased WFMB from Barry in 1962, and 105.9 MHz became WLAC-FM and increased power to 100,000 watts. Program Director Mark Prichard hired Walker to do mornings (6AM-noon) on the powerful station. The studios were in the glass-enclosed observation deck of the L&C Tower, 31 stories above Nashville.

Walker commented, “What a dream job, working sometimes in the clouds and watching the sun rise daily over the Cumberland River."

Prior to each morning's radio show on the FM, Walker would stop by WLAC-AM to get news and weather from the teletype. Nashville broadcast legends Herman Grizzard and Roland Wolfe were wrapping-up their broadcasts on WLAC-AM, and talked with Walker over coffee each morning. Later, longtime personality Ernie Keller joined WLAC-FM and he too shared his knowledge.

In the fall of 1965, Walker realized the importance of a college education. He left WLAC-FM to study journalism and English at Middle Tennessee State University (MTSU) in Murfreesboro, Tennessee. While a student at MTSU, he worked part-time for 3-months at Murfreesboro's WMTS (FM) and WGNS (AM). He was program director at WBJF (AM) in Woodbury, until graduating from MTSU in 1968 (now WBRY). Ironically, he would return to Murfreesboro in 1984 to purchase WGNS (AM).

After receiving his BS degree (1968), Walker returned to Nashville where for the next three-years, he was in public relations with the Tennessee Department of Education as well as a Nashville advertising agency.

By 1971, Walker was more than ready to return to radio. His first boss, and mentor, Bill Barry hired him to operate a new big band format station that he had built. WAMB came on the air April 12, 1971 at 1190 kHz with 250 watts daytime only. Barry was able to move to 1170 kHz and jump it to 5,000 watts daytime, then 10,000 daytime and eventually to 1160 kHz with a maximum AM power of 50,000 watts daytime and 1,000 watts at night.

He continued to learn from broadcast legends, because WAMB's "blow torch" signal attracted Snooky Lanson, Bob Sticht, Buzz Benson, Ken Bramming, Bill Britain, Jack Gallo and other major market talent. Over the next fourteen years, Walker's on-the-job training was priceless.

'WGNS (Ownership)'

In 1984, Walker moved into ownership. He and local Weight Watcher's franchisee Ray Kalil purchased WGNS in Murfreesboro. Walker was able to later purchase Kalil's share in WGNS. Ironically, his ownership of WGNS has lasted longer than the combined years of all previous three owners. (Cecil Elrod 1947-1960; Regional Broadcasting was William Vogel and Monte Hale 1960-1979; and Davidson Broadcasting 1979-1984; Walker's Rutherford Group purchased WGNS in 1984).

Walker built WGNS on the theory established by its first owner, Cecil Elrod. The callsign (GNS) stood for Good Neighbor Station, and the news content, programming, and the way advertisers and listeners were treated, was as if it was done by a "Good Neighbor".

WGNS focuses on local news, high school and college sports, and local government meetings. Local leaders, including the mayor, police chief, and judges, host talk radio shows on the station. Truman Jones, who served as Rutherford County's Sheriff for over three decades, has hosted a weekday morning talk show on WGNS from 9:00 to 10:00 AM since early 2011. The show covers local history and interviews with residents of Rutherford County, Tennessee.

During natural disasters (tornadoes, floods, ice storms, etc.) along with other emergencies, WGNS stops regular programming and devotes 100 per cent of its on-air time to informing the public. This has earned the station the Tennessee Emergency Management Agency's "Station of the Year Award" several times, along with acclaims from the National Association of Broadcasters and recognition by the Tennessee Association of Broadcasters.

'COMMUNITY INVOLVEMENT'

Walker strongly believes that a station, its management and personnel must be heavily involved in the local community. This is evidenced in Walker having been Chairman of the Board for Rutherford County CrimeStoppers, the Heart of Tennessee Red Cross Chapter, Tennessee Association of Broadcasters, President of the Murfreesboro Rotary Club, and Elder with Murfreesboro's First Presbyterian Church (PC-USA). He has also served on the boards of the Rutherford County Chamber of Commerce, St. Clair Street Senior Center, Leadership Rutherford, and Committee On Ministry with the Presbytery of Middle Tennessee (PC-USA).

'HONORS AND AWARDS'

Walker has been honored with the highest award given by the Tennessee Association of Broadcasters, its Distinguished Service Award (2002), and Leadership Rutherford's Pinnacle Award (2011). The family business also received the 2004 Better Business Bureau's "TORCH AWARD" honoring the highest standards of ethics and conduct.

On May 14, 2016, Walker was inducted into the TENNESSEE RADIO HALL OF FAME The Murfreesboro, Tennessee Chapter of the NAACP honored Bart Walker on January 14, 2017, by presenting him the JERRY ANDERSON HUMANITARIAN AWARD at the Annual Martin Luther King, Jr. Breakfast that was held at Middle Tennessee State University.

In 2019 The Tennessee Radio Hall of Fame honored WGNS with the coveted "LUTHER AWARD". The Luther Award honors one outstanding Tennessee radio station for its above and beyond service provided for the community it served. This award was named for Chattanooga radio legend Luther Masingill, who spent more than 70-years at one station and woke listeners up daily with plenty of local news, weather reports, community events, as well as helping the community find missing pets. Like Luther Masingill, those who receive this award not only have a heart for serving, but a desire to devote their lives to serving the radio station’s city of license.

He noted that his wife, Lee Ann, has encouraged him from when they were married in 1967, including helping with advertising sales and promotions at WGNS. Their daughter Kristin helped with on-air duties for many years, and son Scott has learned all facets of broadcasting and is now President and General Manager of WGNS. Bart points with pride to have a true "Mom and Pop radio station" during a time of "corporate giants".

'WGNS Gets Nation's First FM Translator'

Walker's love for radio and habit of persistence, not only helped WGNS (first US radio station to get this new service), but other AM broadcasters across the United States. He commented, “It made sense for AM licensees to be allowed to put their programming on FM translators."

In 2004 he applied for an FM translator and received the license. However, the Federal Communications Commission did not approve his request to place WGNS' programming on that FM translator. Regular trips to Washington, visits with our legislative leaders—all proved unsuccessful.”

It wasn't until December 2005 when the U.S. Senate approved President George W. Bush's nominee, Deborah Taylor Tate, of Tennessee to serve an unexpired term as Commissioner with the Federal Communications Commission that was when things began to change. Not only was Mrs. Tate from Tennessee, but she grew up in Murfreesboro.

In January 2006, she was a guest on WGNS' morning talk show and shared how growing-up in Murfreesboro, Tennessee and attending public schools, prepared her for one of the most powerful positions in the nation.

After the broadcast, Walker talked with her about the issues facing AM broadcasters. He told her that noise and interference on AM signals was running listeners away. The static was being generated by fluorescent lights, power line hum, cable TV and other sources of interference. Walker noted that FM broadcasters had long been allowed to use FM translators to fill-in weak signal areas, and he hoped the FCC would allow AM licensees to do the same.

Commissioner Tate saw the logic, and within a few months had the rule-making procedure moving forward. The National Association of Broadcasters supported the idea, and WGNS received Special Temporary Authority (STA) to use an FM translator. On March 1, 2007, WGNS began translating its AM signal on two translators, making it the first AM station in America to utilize this new service.

Commissioner Tate's work has enabled many AM broadcasters to get FM translators and better serve their communities with local news, high school sports, weather, natural disaster information and more. The FM translators solved a meaningful problem for AM broadcasters, who had been suffering from dramatically increased interference on the medium wave band.

On May 10, 2022, the Heart of Tennessee Chapter of the American Red Cross named Bart Walker the 2022 Hero Honoree

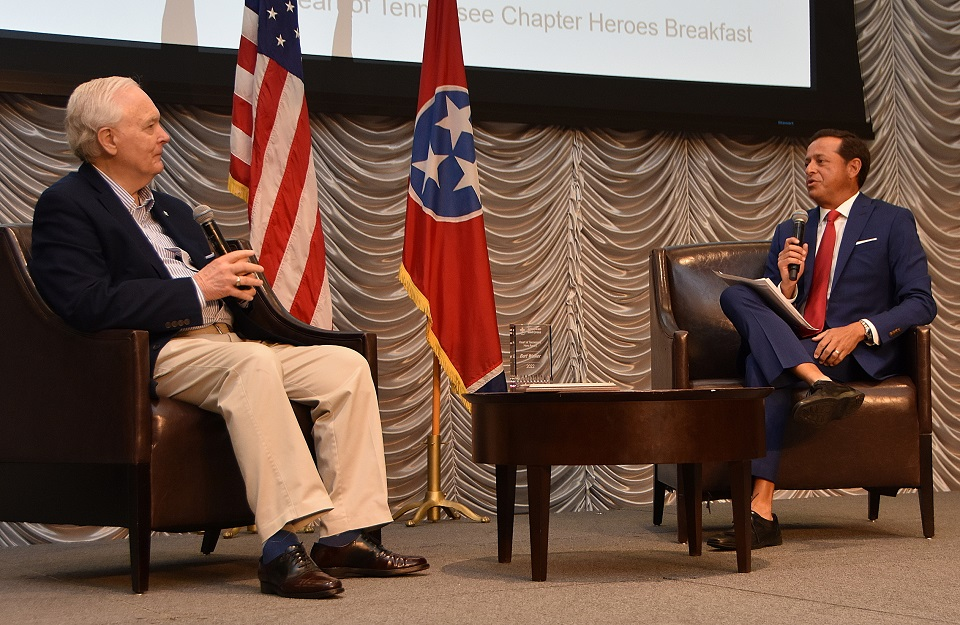

Walker served as the Chairman of the local Red Cross chapter when several hundred evacuees from Hurricane Katrina were flown to the Smyrna Airport in September, 2005. Nick Paranjape interviewed Walker at the Heroes Breakfast that was held in the ballroom of Middle Tennessee State University's Student Union Building.

While chair, the local chapter moved from its Commercial Court location to a highly visible and heavy traffic location at 501 Memorial Boulevard in Murfreesboro, Tennessee.

https://www.redcross.org/local/tennessee/about-us/news-and-events/events/heart-of-tennessee-heroes.html
