= Blue Raider Network =

Collegiate sports radio network

- Type: Radio network
- Country: United States
- Availability: various AM and FM radio stations
- Headquarters: Murfreesboro, Tennessee
- Area: Nashville, Tennessee; Manchester, Tennessee; Cookeville, Tennessee; Huntsville, Alabama; Bowling Green, Kentucky
- Owner: Middle Tennessee State University Broadcasting Dept. Learfield Sports
- Official website: GoBlueRaiders.com

The Blue Raider Network is the sports radio network for the Middle Tennessee State University Athletic teams, the Middle Tennessee Blue Raiders. It broadcasts men's and women's basketball, as well as football and baseball games. The events are broadcast over six radio stations, and a few of the station's translators.

The network is a joint unit of the university's broadcasting department and Learfield Sports.

== On-air personnel ==
- Chip Walters—Play-by-play commentary (Football and Men's Basketball)
- Dick Palmer—Play-by-play commentary (Baseball and Women's Basketball)
- Kyle Turnham - Color Analyst (Men's Basketball)
- Dennis Burke - Color Analyst (Football)
- Duane Hickey - Color Analyst (Women's Basketball)

== Radio stations ==
City	Station	Notes
Worldwide	GoBlueRaiders.com	Online broadcasts of the games.
Murfreesboro	WMOT-FM 89.5	Flagship station of the network
Murfreesboro	WGNS AM 1450	Also broadcast over 100.5 FM W263AI and 101.9 FM W270AF Murfreesboro.
Pegram/Nashville	WPRT-FM 102.5 The Game	Also serves the Clarksville TN and Bowling Green (KY) areas due to close proximity.
Cookeville	WUCT AM 1600	
Cookeville	W231DG FM 94.1	
Manchester	WMSR AM 1320	

== Blue Raider Television Network ==
In some cases, some MTSU Blue Raiders football, basketball, and (to a lesser extent) baseball games are shown on Nashville area MyNetworkTV affiliate WUXP-TV. The broadcasts would be either legit from the Blue Raider Network itself, or via the syndicated Conference USA package by the ad hoc American Sports Network, which started operations in late August 2014 by the Sinclair Broadcasting Group (the owner of WUXP and WZTV).
