= Teen Kids News =

- Also known as: EKN Worldwide Kids News (September 2002-January 2003)
- Genre: Children's television series News program
- Created by: Al Primo; Alan J. Weiss
- Country of origin: United States
- Original language: English
- No. of seasons: 14

Production
- Executive producers: Al Primo; Alan J. Weiss
- Producers: Tania Wilk; Marilou Yacoub
- Running time: 30 minutes (with commercials)
- Production company: Alan Weiss Productions

Original release
- Network: First-run syndication
- Release: September 27, 2003 – present

Teen Kids News (initially titled EKN Worldwide Kids News, alternately abbreviated on-air as TKN since 2012 and previously known as Kids News) is an American educational newsmagazine series aimed at teenagers between the ages of 13 and 16 years old and their parents that premiered in first-run syndication on September 27, 2003, but currently ran for over 20 years. Teen Kids News discusses important issues in a format intended to educate and inform both kids and adults. In-studio segments are shot at studios in Manhattan, NY with field reports done on location around the country and world. The series meets Federal Communications Commission guidelines for educational and informational programming. U.S. television stations are required by law to broadcast three hours of children's programming each week; the majority of affiliates that run the series regularly air it on Saturday or Sunday mornings depending on the station, though a few air the series on Fridays in the morning or daytime periods.

The series airs on over 200 television stations covering, approximately 91% nationwide, and is seen in 1,000 locations in 175 countries worldwide through the American Forces Network and is seen in 12,600 middle and high schools through a special classroom education feed.

Starting with the tenth-season premiere on September 15, 2012, Teen Kids News began broadcasting in high-definition. In-studio segments are broadcast in the format, though most field reports continue to be produced and aired in 4:3 standard definition, with pillarboxing added to fill the left and right sides of widescreen TV sets.

== Background ==
The series was created by Al Primo, former news director for KYW-TV in Philadelphia and WABC-TV in New York City and creator of the popular Eyewitness News concept. Primo launched the series as a project to give young people the opportunity to develop an interest in the journalism industry by delivering news and information to their peers. Teen Kids News was originally known as EKN Worldwide Kids News for the first half of the series' first season, until borrowing its current name. The series was the first attempt at a syndicated news show aimed at children since the cancellation of the similar News for Kids in 1996.

== Production and content ==
Educational content for the show was first provided by the kid-oriented Weekly Reader publication which has since ceased publication. From its launch until the 2009-10 season, the series began each TV broadcast with a summary of the week's news stories with footage supplied by Fox News via its Fox News Channel in the Classroom initiative; this was eliminated in the commercial broadcast but continues to be included in the educational production as a Current Events segment. The commercial program dropped the newscast in favor of airing special-interest stories on issues important to today's children, and features of youths helping out special causes, which was recently featured following the news summary prior to that point. The series is formatted similarly to a newsmagazine and features special-interest, sports and entertainment stories; before certain news segments and before most commercial breaks, the series features specialized short pieces about environmental issues and offbeat stories. Sports segments are also provided during the show also in the form of special-interest pieces, and NBC Sports produces a segment that airs in the months leading up to the Olympics called "Olympic Insight" that began in 2008 prior to the Summer Olympics, featuring interviews and footage of well-known athletes.

The show also features educationally-based segments such as "Word," a game in which three words (many not commonly used in the vocabulary of the show's target demographic) are illustrated by their meaning. The program is closed captioned and is used as an English as a second language (ESL) tool in certain areas. Entertainment stories have also been a common use on the series, generally aired as the last story of the TV broadcast, and often featured interviews with upcoming actors and musicians which have included The Jonas Brothers, Corbin Bleu and Modern Family cast member Sarah Hyland.

== On-air personalities ==
The show's primary anchor, Mwanzaa, who had been with the series since its September 2003 premiere, departed in September 2013. All anchors and reporters for the program range in age between 10 and 20 years of age; unlike traditional newscasts and news magazine programs, the series never discloses the last names of its anchors and reporters, identifying them on a first name basis only. A number of the anchors/reporters were children of television anchors/reporters. Currently, the co-anchors are Luke, Veronique and Christin.

The series has featured over the years, anchors/reporters who are children of well-known television personalities and journalists including Haley Cohen, the show's original anchor from 2003 to 2007 and daughter of former CBS and Fox News journalist Paula Zahn; Jenna Ruggiero, reporter from 2003 to 2009 and daughter of popular New York City anchor/reporter Rosanna Scotto of Fox owned-and-operated station WNYW; Cody Gifford, sports anchor during the first two seasons and son of Kathie Lee and Frank Gifford; Sloane Glass, daughter of Nancy Glass and Charles Lachman served as a reporter. And Meredith Viera's son, Gabe Cohen, sports anchor during the remaining two seasons and currently the general assignment reporter for KOMO-TV in Seattle.

== Reception ==
=== Critical reception ===
The advocacy group Children Now acknowledged Teen Kids News as one of eight children's programs which really meet FCC educational requirements for children's programming and is listed as a preferred program by the group along with others such as PBS's Sesame Street.

Teen Kids News received a New York Emmy Award in 2013 and was nominated for a national Daytime Emmy Award for its series on the USS New York (LPD-21).

The show has also been acknowledged by People, TV Guide, and the New York Daily News. It has been featured on NBC's Today and Comedy Central's The Daily Show with Jon Stewart.

=== Ratings ===
According to Nielsen Media Research, Teen Kids News received a 1.0 national rating for the November 2009 sweeps period. The series performed well among adult viewers with an estimated 600,000 women aged 18–54 and 400,000 men aged 18–54.

== Sponsorship ==
The series is very restrictive in its selection of underwriters for specific segments and those seen in its commercial breaks, and follows strict guidelines and maintains the distinction between editorial and sponsorship. Sponsors generally come from the areas of apparel, entertainment, health and beauty, electronics, retail and the U.S. government.

Toy companies and food companies are excluded from buying commercial space for the series and are not allowed to be sponsors on the series, certain other syndicated children's TV series also follow this policy as well and therefore ads airing on the show generally appeal to adult viewers instead of the program's target demographic.

== International versions ==
Impressed by the positive message of the series, a programming executive at Rustavi 2 in the Republic of Georgia approached Al Primo to create a version of Teen Kids News for the country. The Georgian version of the series titled Sabavshvo Ambebi, premiered on March 22, 2009.

Negotiations are underway with several countries to license Teen Kids News as an educational concept, a nation building project, a program to preserve the cultural heritage of the country and ESL tool.
