= KOCM =

Television station in Norman, Oklahoma

- Norman–Oklahoma City, Oklahoma; United States
- City: Norman, Oklahoma
- Channels: Digital: 16 (UHF); Virtual: 46

Programming
- Affiliations: 46.1: Daystar; 46.2: Daystar Español; 46.3: Daystar Reflections

Ownership
- Owner: Daystar Television Network; (Word of God Fellowship, Inc.)

History
- First air date: 2003
- Former channel numbers: Analog: 46 (UHF, 2003–2009); Digital: 46 (UHF, 2009–2019)
- Call sign meaning: Oklahoma City Ministry

Technical information
- Licensing authority: FCC
- Facility ID: 84225
- ERP: 27 kW
- HAAT: 416 m (1,365 ft)
- Transmitter coordinates: 35°33′36.9″N 97°29′7.6″W

Links
- Public license information: Public file; LMS
- Website: www.daystar.com

KOCM (channel 46) is a religious television station licensed to Norman, Oklahoma, United States, serving the Oklahoma City area. The station is owned by the Daystar Television Network. KOCM's offices and master control facilities are located on 72nd Avenue Northeast in Norman, and its transmitter is located near the John Kilpatrick Turnpike/I-44 in northeast Oklahoma City.

The station first signed on the air in 2003, and was built and signed on by Daystar through Word of God Fellowship.

== Technical information ==
=== Subchannels ===
The station's signal is multiplexed:

Subchannels of KOCM
Channel	Res.	Short name	Programming
46.1	1080i	KOCM-DT	Daystar
46.2	720p	KOCM-ES	Daystar Español
46.3	480i	KOCM-ES	Daystar Reflections

=== Analog-to-digital conversion ===
Because it was granted an original construction permit after the Federal Communications Commission (FCC) finalized the DTV allotment plan on April 21, 1997, the station did not receive a companion channel for a digital television station. Instead, at the end of the digital conversion period for full-service television stations, KOCM was required to turn off its analog signal and turn on its digital signal (called a "flash-cut"). KOCM discontinued regular programming on its analog signal, over UHF channel 46, on June 12, 2009, as part of the federally mandated transition from analog to digital television. The station "flash-cut" its digital signal into operation UHF channel 46.
