= Charles Lachman =

American television producer and author

Charles Lachman is an American television producer and author who is best known for his work as the executive producer of the nationally syndicated news magazine program Inside Edition. The show has been on the air for more than two decades. He has also authored five books.

Lachman has been a prominent figure in the television newsmagazine genre for several decades. He began his tenure with Inside Edition in 1995 as co-executive producer and assumed the role of executive producer in 1998. Under his leadership, Inside Edition has consistently ranked as one of the top-rated shows in national syndication. Produced and distributed by CBS Media Ventures, Inside Edition is noted for its blend of human interest stories, investigative reporting, and coverage of celebrity and pop culture.

Prior to his role as executive producer, Lachman served as managing editor of Inside Edition. He also held positions as senior producer and co-executive producer for the news magazine program American Journal from 1993 to 1998, and managing editor of evening newscasts at WNYW-TV (FOX) in New York. Before his involvement in television production, Lachman worked as a reporter for the New York Post.

In addition to his television career, Lachman is an accomplished author. Lachman's first novel, In the Name of the Law was published on January 1, 1988, by St. Martin's Press.

Lachman is also author of the historical family saga The Last Lincolns, published February 2, 2010 by Union Square & Co. The book tells the story of Abraham Lincoln's family following the assassination.

A Secret Life was published January 1, 2013 by Skyhorse Publishing. The investigative biography delves into the life of President Grover Cleveland.

Footsteps in the Snow, published November 4, 2014 by Berkley, is a true crime saga chronicling the coldest case in U.S. history ever to be brought to trial.

Codename Nemo: The Hunt for a Nazi U-boat and the Elusive Enigma Machine, was published June 4, 2024 by Diversion Books and is a World War II history recounting a daring military operation.

His most recent non-fiction book is They Shall Not See the Dawn: The Manhunt for the Third Reich's Most Wanted.

== Bibliography ==
- Charles Lachman (1988), In the Name of the Law, St. Martin's Press, ISBN 978-0-312-02589-2
- Charles Lachman (2010), The Last Lincolns: The Rise and Fall of a Great American Family, Union Square Press, ISBN 978-1-4027-7121-7
- Charles Lachman (1 August 2011), A Secret Life: The Lies and Scandals of President Grover Cleveland, Skyhorse, ISBN 978-1-62873-054-8
- Charles Lachman (4 November 2014), Footsteps in the Snow, Penguin Publishing Group, ISBN 978-0-698-14746-1
- Charles Lachman (4 June 2024), Codename Nemo: The Hunt for a Nazi U-Boat and The Elusive Enigma Machine, Diversion Books, ISBN 978-1-6357-6871-8
- Charles, Lachman (25 August 2026), They Shall Not See the Dawn: The Manhunt for the Third Reich's Most Wanted, Diversion Books, ISBN 979-8895151068
