= When Ruled the World =

- Also known as: When __ Ruled the World
- Country of origin: United States
- No. of episodes: 12

Production
- Running time: 60 minutes

Original release
- Network: VH1

When __ Ruled the World is a television series on VH1 that covers pop culture history.

== Episode list ==
1. Supermodels
2. Metal
3. Rated X
4. Stand-Up Comics
5. Disco
6. Playboy
7. Kiss
8. The Partridge Family
9. Star Wars
10. Melrose Place
11. Metallica
12. Jerry Springer
