= Channel 38 digital TV stations in the United States =

The following television stations broadcast on digital channel 38 in the United States:

- K38IM in Albuquerque, New Mexico, now K34PZ-D

The following stations, which are no longer licensed, formerly broadcast on digital channel 38:

- K38BU-D in Gruver, Texas
- K38FO-D in Carbondale, Colorado
- K38KZ-D in Bovina, etc., Texas
- K38LK-D in Jacks Cabin, Colorado
- K38OF-D in Crowley, Louisiana
- K38OR-D in Jonesboro, Arkansas
- KNDX-LD in Dickinson, North Dakota
- KVFW-LD in Fort Worth, Texas
- KZMD-LD in Lufkin, Texas
- W38EM-D in Albany, Georgia
- W38FI-D in Laurel, Mississippi
- WALM-LD in Sebring, Florida
- WBMG-LD in Moody, Alabama
