= Adventure Camp =

- Country of origin: United States

Production
- Running time: 30 minutes (with commercials)

Original release
- Network: Discovery Kids
- Release: May 17, 2003 – June 14, 2008

Adventure Camp is an American television series that aired on Discovery Kids. The show took place at SeaWorld Orlando and Busch Gardens Tampa. It was based upon the real life camps of SeaWorld/Busch Gardens Adventure Camps. The show was not staged, and the campers did take part in real life Adventure camp activities such as diving in the SeaWorld shark tank and cleaning up after animals on the veldt at Busch Gardens Tampa.

After the series ended, reruns continued to air on The Hub until March 25, 2012.

== Plot ==
The summary is four kids from the United States and four kids from the United Kingdom go to Florida. They have many adventures such as feeding orcas at Seaworld and cleaning up after animals at Busch Gardens. Adventure Camp aired in March 2008. It was being shown on Discovery Kids. Many of the adventures are exciting, thrilling, and sometimes gross, but at the end someone who showed a quality such as teamwork would receive a necklace and the honor to get to go on an extra special adventure the following day.

Each camper received a necklace and were told that if they earned 20 beads on the necklace by the end of the trip, then they would get a close encounter with an animal of some kind, which turned out to be swimming with dolphins. Domonique was the only one not to earn enough beads, but Melissa felt that Domonique deserved them more and then gave two of her beads to Domonique. The counselors then gave Melissa a chance to earn the extra 2 needed by participating in a manatee release.

== Season 1 Animal Care ==
Each of the eight campers is given an animal to take care of throughout the duration of Adventure Camp. It is unknown who took care of Brandon's animal after he left the camp in episode 7.

| Camper | Hometown | Animal |
|---|---|---|
| Bill | McLean, Virginia | Toad/Aquarium |
| Brandon | South Lake Tahoe, California | Turtle |
| Chad | Silver Spring, Maryland | Reef Aquarium |
| David | Huntsville, Texas | Yellow Rat Snake |
| Domonique | Sylmar, California | Alligator |
| Kimmy | Tucson, Arizona | Anoles |
| Melissa | Marietta, Georgia | Hermit Crabs |
| Sadie | Canyon Lake, California | Sharks |

== Season 1 episodes ==
| # | Episode Title |
|---|---|
| 1 | Arrival |
| 2 | Manatee Rescue |
| 3 | Crystal River |
| 4 | Zookeeper for a Day |
| 5 | Escape for a Day |
| 6 | Trainer for a Day |
| 7 | Adventure Venture |
| 8 | Trek to the Everglades |
| 9 | Swamp Safari |
| 10 | Everlasting Everglades |
| 11 | Scramble for the Beads |
| 12 | Judgment Day |
| 13 | Dolphin Swim |

== Season 2 ==
See Adventure Florida

A second season aired on Discovery Kids, in 2008 and featured 4 kids from the United States and 4 kids from the United Kingdom. The counselors were Bill Street and Kelly Deidring. In every episode a word relating to a quality they should have, such as respect or tolerance, was said to the campers and the counselors would give a necklace to the camper who they feel represented that word the best on that day. Then the camper could choose another camper to go with them on a special experience. In the end, Warren won the final challenge and got to keep the necklace for good.

=== Season 2 Animal Care ===
Each of the eight campers pick a piece of paper with the names of two animals on it, The two campers who each pick the same animals must take care of those two animals together during the duration of Adventure Camp. Each of the eight campers also are given an animal to do a presentation on the final day of camp.

| Camper | Age | Hometown | Animal care | Presentation |
|---|---|---|---|---|
| Adriana | 12 | Branch, Louisiana | Sloth & Macaw | Macaw |
| Alex | 13 | Southampton, England | Cuscus & Possum | Cuscus |
| Ally | 15 | Ipswich, England | Cuscus & Possum | Possum |
| Brian | 13 | McLean, Virginia | Lemurs & Reptiles | Lemurs |
| Chris | 14 | Santa Maria, California | Flamingos & Skunk | Flamingos |
| Claire | 12 | Watford, England | Flamingos & Skunk | Skunk |
| Cori | 13 | Chicago, Illinois | Sloth & Macaw | Sloth |
| Warren | 14 | Birmingham, England | Lemurs & Reptiles | Reptiles |

=== Season 2 episodes ===
| # | Episode Title |
|---|---|
| 14 | Welcome to Florida |
| 15 | Animals 101 |
| 16 | Gators on the River |
| 17 | See the Sea of Life |
| 18 | Meet the Manatees |
| 19 | The GeoCache Challenge |
| 20 | Big Cat Call |
| 21 | Pole to Pole |
| 22 | Date with Dolphins |
| 23 | The Reptile Encounter |
| 24 | Swimming with Sharks |
| 25 | Animals of the Everglades |
| 26 | Key to the Keys, Part 1 |
| 27 | Key to the Keys, Part 2 |
| 28 | Going Home |
