= Channel 11 virtual TV stations in Canada =

The following television stations operate on virtual channel 11 in Canada:

- CBAFT-DT in Moncton, New Brunswick
- CBVT-DT in Quebec City, Quebec
- CBXFT-DT in Edmonton, Alberta
- CFGC-DT in Sudbury, Ontario
- CFRE-DT in Regina, Saskatchewan
- CFTF-DT-6 in Rivière-du-Loup, Quebec
- CHAU-DT-8 in Cloridorme, Quebec
- CHCH-DT in Hamilton, Ontario
- CHCH-DT-1 in Ottawa, Ontario
- CHNB-DT-1 in Fredericton, New Brunswick
- CKMI-DT-2 in Sherbrooke, Quebec
- CKWS-DT in Kingston, Ontario
