= List of television stations in American Samoa =

This is a list of broadcast television stations that are licensed in the territory of American Samoa.

== Full-power stations ==
VC refers to the station's PSIP virtual channel. RF refers to the station's physical RF channel.

Area served	City of license	VC	RF	Callsign	Network	Notes
Pago Pago		2	2	KVZK-2	PBS	
Pago Pago		4	4	KVZK-4	ABC, CBS	
Pago Pago		5	5	KVZK-5	NBC	

KVZK-TV previously operated analog stations on channels 8, 10 and 12 prior to 1974.

== LPTV stations ==
Area served	City of license	VC	RF	Callsign	Network	Notes
Pago Pago		11	11	K11UU-D	Hope Channel	PCS Television on 11.2
Pago Pago		30	30	KBAD-LD	Ind.	Silent

A station that had a construction permit but never made it to air, K34HI, would have carried Fox programming.
