= Surf Girls =

- Genre: Reality
- No. of seasons: 1

Original release
- Network: MTV
- Release: May 12 – July 7, 2003

Surf Girls is a reality television series on MTV that aired from May 12, 2003 to July 7, 2003. The show consisted of 14 amateur surfers trying to win for the chance to go professional. The show was a collaboration between MTV and Quiksilver women's brand Roxy.

The winners of the show were Jen Pollock and Mary Osbourne. Osbourne later won the 2009 and 2010 Malibu Surfing Association's annual Classic competition.

== Cast ==
Name	Type of Board	Age	Background
Jen Pollock (Winner)	Short	24	college student/waitress from Kailua, Hawaii
Mary Osbourne (Winner)	Long	21	college student/waitress from Ventura, California
Katie Thornton	Short	21	professional cheerleader from Athens, Georgia. Eliminated in the 6th episode.
Kula Barbieto	Long	19	flight attendant from Ka'u, Hawaii
Aimee Vogelgesang	Long	18	college student / smoothie girl from Kailua, Hawaii. Dropped out after 2nd episode.
Molli Miller	Short	18	high school student from Atlantic Beach, Florida
Jenna Grosshans	Long	18	high school student from Oxnard, California
April Grover	Long	20	college student / surf shop retailer from Melbourne Beach, Florida
Robyn Tassi-Curley	Short	20	waitress from West Palm Beach, Florida
Vivian Cordero	Long	22	DMS controller from New Milford, New Jersey
Bonnie Campanella	Short	18	college student / retailer from Glendora, California. Eliminated in the 3rd episode.
Heidi Drazich	Short	19	member of the Roxy Amateur Team from Cocoa Beach, Florida
Neva Massey	Short	19	restaurant hostess from Rincon, Puerto Rico. Dropped out after 2nd episode.
Lauren Stinson	Short	22	college student/shooter girl from Surfside, California. Dropped out after 3rd episode.

== Controversy ==
Transworld Surf reported that one of the judges, Jon Rose, said despite judges voting a girl off, the show's producers reversed their decision in order to keep her in the game.
