= Battlefield Detectives =

- Country of origin: United States
- No. of seasons: 4
- No. of episodes: 32

Production
- Running time: 48/49 minutes (60 with ads)

Original release
- Network: History Channel
- Release: October 4, 2003 – November 19, 2006

Battlefield Detectives is a forensic documentary television series that aired on the History Channel from 2003 to 2006. The series explores famous battles focusing on the battlefield itself, and tell its story based on recent scientific research. It uses modern science to examine how the battles were won or lost.

== Format ==
According to History Television: "This series approaches the perennially interesting topic of famous battles in a fresh and exhilarating way. Focusing on the battlefield itself, each programme takes an important battle telling its story and posing a puzzling central question about the battle that recent scientific research is helping to illuminate - a contemporary journey of discovery and a compelling story from the past."

== Episodes ==
Episode name / original air date

=== Season 1 ===
1. "Custer at Little Bighorn," 4 October 2003
2. "Charge of the Light Brigade," 11 October 2003
3. "The Gallipoli Disaster," 18 October 2003
4. "What Sank the Armada?," 25 October 2003
5. "Who Got Lucky at Hastings?," 8 November 2003
6. "Massacre at Waterloo," 9 November 2003
7. "Agincourt's Dark Secrets," 23 November 2003
8. "Trafalgar," 13 December 2003
9. "Vietnam," 27 December 2003

=== Season 2 ===
1. "World War II: Operation Market Garden," 12 November 2004
2. "Native American Wars: The Apache," 19 November 2004
3. "American Revolution: Battle of Monmouth," 26 November 2004
4. "World War I: The Somme," 3 December 2004
5. "Mexican–American War: Battle of Palo Alto," 10 December 2004
6. "American Revolution: Battle of Cowpens," 17 December 2004
7. "Civil War: Battle of Gettysburg," 20 December 2004
8. "Civil War: Battle of Antietam," 20 December 2004

=== Season 3 ===
1. "Battle of the Bulge," 14 November 2005
2. "Battle of Britain," 21 November 2005
3. "Waterloo," 28 November 2005
4. "Siege of Masada," 5 December 2005
5. "American Revolutionary War: Battle of Oriskany," 5 December 2005
6. "World War I: Jutland," 12 December 2005
7. "Stalingrad," 23 December 2005
8. "The War of 1812: The Chesapeake and the Shannon," 23 December 2005
9. "Pointe du Hoc," 30 December 2005
10. "The 6-Day War," 30 December 2005
11. "Civil War: Shiloh," 2 January 2006
12. "Alesia," 9 January 2006
13. "Battle of Big Hole," 30 January 2006

=== Season 4 ===
1. "Siege of Alesia," 5 November 2006
2. "Trafalgar's Fatal Flaw," 19 November 2006

== Book ==
An accompanying book reflects on seven of the most famous battlefields in history: The Battle of Hastings, The Battle of Agincourt, The Spanish Armada, Waterloo, The Charge of the Light Brigade, The Battle of Little Bighorn, and Gallipoli. It uses traditional methods and modern technology to discover what really happened on the day. The results include new and controversial insights into some of the world's enduring military mysteries. Battlefield Detectives uses evidence uncovered by a team of experts from a wide range of disciplines: archaeologists, forensic scientists, crowd dynamics specialists, metal-detectorists and military experts contribute to a new understanding of these fields of war.

- Battlefield Detectives [illustrated] by David Wason.
- (Hardcover/Paperback) 256 pages
- March 2003
- Publisher: Granada Media
- ISBN 0233050833
