= Channel 11 TV stations in Canada =

The following television stations broadcast on digital or analog channel 11 in Canada:

- CBAFT-DT in Moncton, New Brunswick
- CFER-DT in Rimouski, Quebec
- CFGC-DT in Sudbury, Ontario
- CFRE-DT in Regina, Saskatchewan
- CFTF-DT-6 in Rivière-du-Loup, Quebec
- CFTM-DT in Montreal, Quebec
- CHAU-DT-8 in Cloridorme, Quebec
- CHCH-TV-7 in Timmins, Ontario
- CJDC-TV-1 in Fort Saint John, British Columbia
- CKMI-DT-2 in Sherbrooke, Quebec
- CKWS-DT in Kingston, Ontario

== Defunct ==
- CFJC-TV-8 in Chase, British Columbia
- CFRN-TV-11 in Jasper, Alberta
- CHAN-TV-1 in Chilliwack, British Columbia
- CHAN-TV-4 in Courtenay, British Columbia
- CHTY-TV in Yellowknife, Northwest Territories
- CHWT-TV in Whitehorse, Yukon
- CITO-TV-2 in Kearns, Ontario
- CIHF-TV-7 in Sydney, Nova Scotia
- CJDG-TV-2 in Lebel-sur-Quévillon, Quebec
- CJDG-TV-3 in Joutel, Quebec
- CKNY-TV-11 in Huntsville, Ontario
- CKYS-TV in Snow Lake, Manitoba
