= Channel 11 TV stations in Mexico =

The following television stations broadcast on digital channel 11 in Mexico:

- XHAMO-TDT in Colima, Colima
- XHUNAM-TDT in Mexico City
- XHPBDG-TDT in Durango, Durango
- XHPBGZ-TDT in Ciudad Guzmán, Jalisco
- XHPBHU-TDT in Huetamo, Michoacán
- XHPBZC-TDT in Zacatlán, Puebla
- XHPBQR-TDT in Querétaro, Querétaro
