= ELONCE =

Canal 11
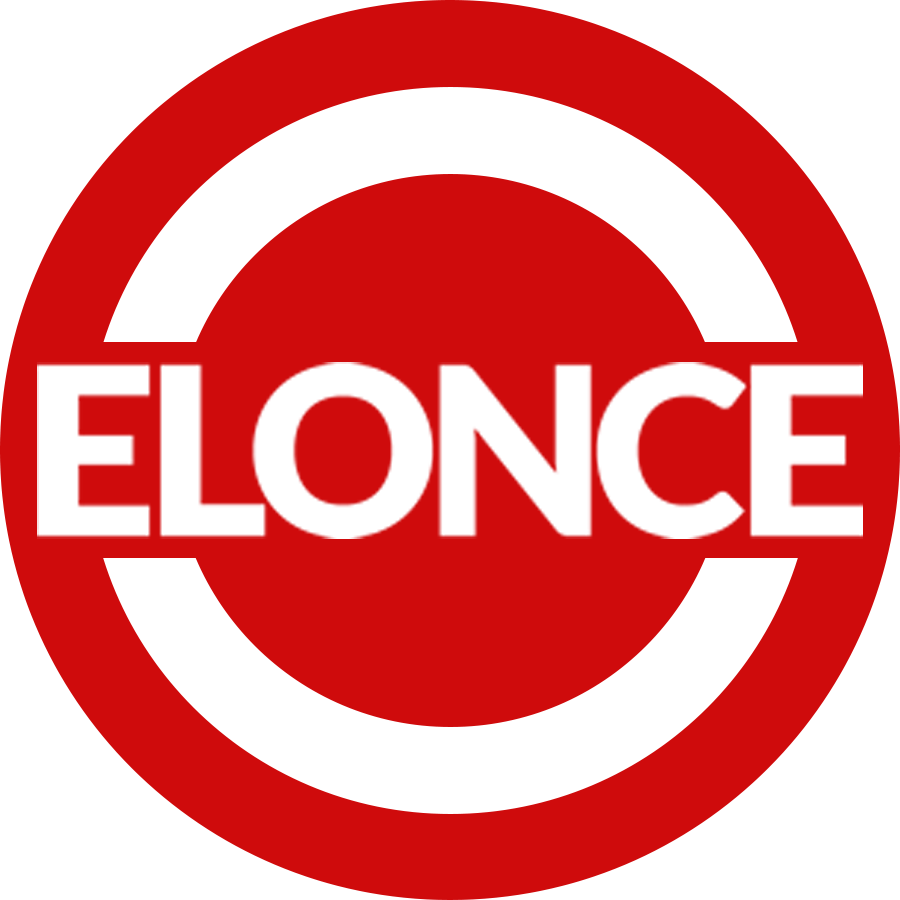
- Paraná, Entre Ríos; Argentina
- Channels: Analog: 11 (VHF)
- Branding: ELONCE

Ownership
- Owner: Federal Comunicaciones S.A.

History
- First air date: 2 May 1992

Technical information
- Licensing authority: ENACOM

Links
- Website: www.elonce.com

Canal 11 Paraná, better known as ELONCE, is an over-the-air television station licensed to the city of Paraná. The station is seen in most of the province and is operated by Federal Comunicaciones S.A..

== History ==
The station started broadcasting on 2 May 1992 by Edgardo Sánchez. In 2009, the station was given a permit to carry the Fútbol para todos program.

Most of the station's programming is local, without relaying programming from any network from Buenos Aires, making it an independent station. As of 2011, the only exceptions were the occasional American films.

The channel was added to Rocstar in November 2023.

In 2004, the station started its Once Por Todos campaign to help the poor. The 2025 edition was cancelled in November 2025 without prior explanation.
