= A Secret Life (book) =

Book by Charles Lachman

A Secret Life: The Lies and Scandals of President Grover Cleveland
- Author: Charles Lachman
- Language: English
- Publisher: Skyhorse Publishing
- Publication date: August 2011
- Publication place: United States
- Pages: 496
- ISBN: 978-1-61608-275-8

A Secret Life: The Lies and Scandals of President Grover Cleveland is a 2011 historical book by American author Charles Lachman.

The book is about President Grover Cleveland's 1884 presidential campaign and the allegations that a decade earlier Cleveland had fathered an illegitimate son and had the child's mother committed to a mental asylum.

== Sources ==
- Presta, John (August 1, 2011). "A Secret Life: The Lies and Scandals of President Grover Cleveland (Review)". New York Journal of Books.
- Lacham, Charles (May 23, 2011). "America's Forgotten Presidential Sex Scandal". The Daily Beast.
- Dotinga, Randy (July 29, 2011). "A presidential sex scandal, 1884-style". The Christian Science Monitor.
