= February 2003 Saddam Hussein interview =

The Saddam Hussein interview is a television interview hosted by American journalist Dan Rather with Iraqi president Saddam Hussein on February 24, 2003, very shortly before the 2003 invasion of Iraq. The interview was aired both in the United States and on all three Iraqi television networks. British politician Tony Benn had also interviewed Saddam earlier that month.

== Background ==
Rather and CBS Evening News executive producer Jim Murphy were driven around Baghdad for 45 minutes and switched cars on two separate occasions to keep Saddam's position secret. The interview was held at the Republican Palace. Neither Rather nor Murphy were allowed to bring their own tape recorders. Saddam supplied his own translator, and CBS approved the translation of the recording. Rather and Murphy were treated well in the course of the interview, with Saddam offering Rather coffee at one point.

=== American interview ===
In the 1980s, Rather had an on-air confrontation with then-vice president George H. W. Bush over the Iran-Contra Affair. His son, George W. Bush, responded similarly, and declined to give Rather an interview during his presidency. After the Saddam interview, the White House was interested in a rebuttal interview. CBS News would accept President Bush, Vice President Dick Cheney or Secretary of State Colin Powell for the interview, but the White House only offered other officials for the interview, such as Ari Fleischer and Dan Bartlett. The CBS network deemed these individuals inappropriate for the broadcast, and an American interview was never done.

== Highlights ==
When asked if he was "afraid of being killed or captured" early in the interview:

Saddam: ...Bear with me. My answers are long.
Rather: Mr. President, I have all night.

Saddam invited President Bush to a live TV debate, to which Bush declined:

Rather: Who would moderate this debate?
Saddam: Yes, you Mr. Rather.
Rather: With respect, Mr. President, I have other problems. I've got enough problems already.

On one occasion Saddam interrupted his translator and corrected his use of the term "Bush", instead of "Mr. Bush", which Saddam explained was out of respect.

== Summary ==
- Saddam declares his support of Allah, Islam and Palestine.
- Saddam denies possessing weapons of mass destruction, or the possession of arms against UN law.
- Saddam denies association with Osama bin Laden and al-Qaeda.
- Saddam declares he will not step down from presidency or ever surrender against a stronger opponent.
- Saddam also declares he will not go into asylum or leave Iraq, maintaining that "We will die here. We will die in this country and we will maintain our honor".
- Saddam claims that his armed forces lost only 10% of their military equipment in 1991's Operation Desert Storm.
- Saddam expressed willingness to participate in a live globally televised Presidential debate prior to any invasion.

== Notes ==
1. Saddam Hussein Interview Airs In Iraq CBS News. February 27, 2003.
