= KTWU =

Television station in Topeka, Kansas

- Topeka, Kansas; United States
- Channels: Digital: 11 (VHF); Virtual: 11
- Branding: KTWU PBS

Programming
- Affiliations: 11.1: PBS; 11.2: World; 11.3: KTWU Enhance/FNX

Ownership
- Owner: Washburn University; (Washburn University of Topeka)

History
- First air date: October 21, 1965
- Former channel numbers: Analog: 11 (VHF, 1965–2009); Digital: 23 (UHF, 2003–2009)
- Former affiliations: NET (1965–1970)
- Call sign meaning: Kansas Topeka Washburn University

Technical information
- Licensing authority: FCC
- Facility ID: 70938
- ERP: 38 kW
- HAAT: 302 m (991 ft)
- Transmitter coordinates: 39°3′50″N 95°45′50″W
- Translator(s): On-air: K30AL-D Iola; Construction permits: 36 (UHF) Emporia; 36 (UHF) Lawrence; 47 (UHF) Manhattan

Links
- Public license information: Public file; LMS
- Website: www.ktwu.org

KTWU (channel 11) is a PBS member television station in Topeka, Kansas, United States, owned by Washburn University. The station's studios are located on the western edge of the Washburn University campus at 19th Street and Jewell Avenue (with a College Avenue mailing address) in central Topeka, and its transmitter is located on Wanamaker Road (south of the Kansas River) on the city's northwest side.

KTWU is carried on many cable and satellite providers throughout eastern Kansas, including on the Kansas side of the Kansas City metropolitan area, giving viewers west of the Missouri River a second choice for PBS programming alongside KCPT.

== History ==
In 1962, the Federal Communications Commission (FCC) assigned the VHF channel 11 allocation in the Topeka market, reserving it for non-commercial broadcasting use. Thad Sandstrom, who at the time was the general manager and vice president of communications at Stauffer Communications, then-owners of WIBW-TV, the city's first television station (which launched nine years earlier in November 1953), helped convince the FCC to allocate channel 11 strictly for educational broadcasters.

While this move assured eastern Kansas of getting educational television (and later, PBS) service, it also meant that Topeka would have a long wait for full service from all three commercial networks. Although Topeka had been large enough on paper to support at least one other commercial station since the late 1950s, the only other available allocations were on the UHF band. Many electronics manufacturers did not begin incorporating UHF tuners onto television sets with UHF tuners until 1964, three years after the FCC passed the All-Channel Receiver Act. This made prospective owners skittish about bidding for the UHF allocations in Topeka. As a result, Topeka would not get a second commercial station until KTSB (channel 27, now KSNT) signed on in 1967.

Washburn University subsequently filed an application to operate a broadcast license to operate a television station on channel 11. The station first signed on the air on October 21, 1965, as a member of National Educational Television (NET). It was the first educational television station in Kansas, and would be the only one in the state until the Sunflower Educational Television Corporation signed on KPTS in Hutchinson in January 1970. KTWU originally operated from studio facilities located in Topeka's Signal Hill neighborhood, near Interstate 70 and Wanamaker Road, initially employing only five staffers. Stauffer Communications owned the Signal Hill building and leased it to Washburn. Stauffer also leased WIBW-TV's original tower in Maple Hill to Washburn.

The station began to struggle after an F5 tornado hit Topeka on June 8, 1966, damaging or destroying nearly every building on campus. The university chose to reallocate money that was originally earmarked for channel 11's operational budget to help in Washburn's rebuilding effort, leaving KTWU to rely mainly on viewer donations and private funding from local foundations and businesses, operating on a lean annual budget of $50,000. Older equipment leased to the station for production and master control services frequently broke down, and broadcasts were occasionally interrupted due to the aging transmission line on its broadcast tower. The Signal Hill studio was also periodically invaded by snakes, mice and insects. Local programming on the station during its early years included high school and college telecourses, and coverage of various sports.

On October 5, 1970, KTWU became a charter member of PBS, which was formed through the merger of National Educational Television with its Newark, New Jersey member station WNDT (now WNET) that was assisted by the Ford Foundation and the Corporation for Public Broadcasting.

For most of its first four decades on the air, KTWU signed-off at midnight seven nights a week. On September 5, 1998, the station converted to a 24-hour programming schedule, filling hours not programmed by KTWU with shows from PBS' default satellite schedule.

== Programming ==
In addition to programming provided by PBS and through independent distributors such as American Public Television, KTWU produces several local programs including (as of 2015) Sunflower Journeys (a program focusing on the history of notable places and people throughout Kansas, which is syndicated regionally to fellow PBS members KCPT in Kansas City, KPTS in Wichita and the Smoky Hills PBS network in western Kansas), Theater of The Mind (an anthology series of televised adaptations of radio plays) and I’ve Got Issues (a monthly community affairs program).

The station has won several Emmy Awards throughout its history, including wins for its production of the Washburn University Holiday Vespers concert, a radio play adaptation of Dracula (as part of its Theater of the Mind series) and Sunflower Journeys.

== Technical information ==
=== Subchannels ===
The station's signal is multiplexed:

Subchannels of KTWU
Channel	Res.	Short name	Programming
11.1	720p	KTWU-HD	PBS
11.2	480i	KTWU-DT2	World (4:3)
11.3	480i	KTWU-DT3	KTWU Enhance / First Nations Experience (4:3)

From 2003 (when KTWU signed on its digital signal on UHF channel 23) to 2005, the station carried PBS' high definition service, PBS HD Channel, on its main channel. On October 1, 2005, KTWU replaced PBS-HD on virtual channel 11.1 with the main schedule on the analog signal.

On May 4, 2009, KTWU became a member station of MHz Worldview, carrying the network on digital subchannel 11.2 (with the exception of a two-hour window from 6 to 8 p.m., in which the subchannel carries PBS Kids programming). On that same date, KTWU launched a third subchannel branded as "KTWU Enhance", which primarily carries lifestyle and how-to programming from Create as well as a selection of additional PBS programming.

=== Analog-to-digital conversion ===
KTWU shut down its analog signal, over VHF channel 11, on February 17, 2009, the original target date on which full-power television stations in the United States were to transition from analog to digital broadcasts under federal mandate (which was later pushed back to June 12, 2009). The station's digital signal relocated from its pre-transition UHF channel 23 to VHF channel 11.

=== Translator ===
- K30AL-D Iola
