= WETV-CD =

Television station in Murfreesboro, Tennessee (1985–2021)

- Murfreesboro, Tennessee; United States
- Channels: Digital: 11 (VHF); Virtual: 11
- Branding: WGNS News Radio 1450 on TV 11

Programming
- Affiliations: Independent (simulcast of WGNS, 1985–2021)

Ownership
- Owner: The Rutherford Group; (Channel Eleven, Inc.)
- Sister stations: WGNS

History
- First air date: September 5, 1985
- Last air date: July 31, 2021
- Former call signs: W11BF (1985–1995); WETV-LP (1995–2015)
- Former channel numbers: Analog: 11 (VHF, 1985–2015)

Technical information
- Licensing authority: FCC
- Facility ID: 10324
- Class: CD
- ERP: 0.01 kW
- HAAT: 78.8 m (259 ft)
- Transmitter coordinates: 35°50′26″N 86°23′27″W

Links
- Public license information: Public file; LMS

WETV-CD (channel 11) was a low-power, Class A independent television station in Murfreesboro, Tennessee, United States. Owned by The Rutherford Group, it was sister to radio station WGNS (1450 AM). WETV-CD's transmitter was located at the intersection of Broad and Church streets in Murfreesboro, sharing tower space with WGNS.

== History ==
The station began broadcasting on September 5, 1985, and had been simulcasting sister radio station WGNS ever since.

During times when syndicated programming was on the air, the station transmitted data from its weather station with WGNS' program audio playing in the background.

At times of local programming, one could see shots of the studio and respective hosts. When viewers tuned to channel 11, they saw the host and his or her guests in the studio, while the radio show was in progress. This technique was also used for the televised versions of Howard Stern and Don Imus' radio shows.

The Federal Communications Commission (FCC) canceled WETV-CD's license on August 3, 2021, due to the station's owners failing to file an application to renew the license prior to its August 1 expiration date.

== Technical information ==
=== Subchannel ===
Subchannel of WETV-CD
Channel	Res.	Short name	Programming
11.1	480i	WETV-CD	Independent / Simulcast of WGNS (4:3)

=== Analog-to-digital conversion ===
Since its sign-on September 5, 1985, WETV broadcast in analog at 61 watts. The station was then approved to "flash-cut" the channel 11 frequency to digital, with a power increase to 300 watts, as this was done on September 1, 2015. However at the same time, WETV ceased broadcasting its analog signal, as it turned on its digital signal.
