= K11UU-D =

Television station in Pago Pago, American Samoa

- Pago Pago; American Samoa
- Channels: Digital: 11 (VHF); Virtual: 11
- Branding: Hope Channel American Samoa

Programming
- Affiliations: 11.1: Hope Channel; for others, see § Subchannels

Ownership
- Owner: American Samoa Adventist Media Ministry, Inc.

History
- Founded: October 14, 2003
- Former call signs: K11UU (2002–2011)
- Former channel numbers: Analog: 11 (VHF, 2002–2011)
- Call sign meaning: Sequentially assigned by the FCC

Technical information
- Licensing authority: FCC
- Facility ID: 130292
- Class: LD
- ERP: 3 kW
- HAAT: −0.7 m (−2 ft)
- Transmitter coordinates: 14°21′14″S 170°44′18″W

Links
- Public license information: LMS
- Website: asamtv.org

K11UU-D (channel 11) is a low-power independent television station in Pago Pago, American Samoa, owned by American Samoa Adventist Media Ministry, Inc.

== History ==
Pacific Channel Samoa (PCS TV), a company owned by Bill Hyman, received a construction permit to build a new channel 11 low-power television station at Pago Pago on January 18, 2002; the station filed for a license to cover on October 14, 2003. Pacific Channel Samoa transferred the license to co-owned Samoa Systems, Inc. in 2010. PCS-TV converted to digital that same year; at that time, it broadcast Australia Network most of the day, live sports from New Zealand and Fiji, and religious programs on the Baháʼí Faith.

Hyman's finances suffered after he lost money making a movie in the early 2010s, prompting him to consider selling the television station. In August 2016, Hyman sold K11UU-D to a Seventh-Day Adventist media group, which he had selected to purchase the station, since it would continue to air religious fare. PCS programming moved to the 11.2 subchannel, and channel 11.1 relaunched as a local outlet under the Hope Channel banner.

== Subchannels ==
The station's digital signal is multiplexed:

Subchannels of K11UU-D
Subchannel	Res.	Short name	Programming
11.1	480i		Hope Channel (4:3)
11.2	480i		PCS TV (4:3)
11.3	480i		[Blank] (4:3)
11.4	480i		[Blank] (4:3)

== See also ==
- Communications in American Samoa
