= NBC 13 =

NBC 13 may refer to one of the following television stations in the United States:

== Current affiliates ==
- KCWY-DT in Casper, Wyoming
- KECI-TV in Missoula, Montana, a part of NBC Montana
- KHNL in Honolulu, Hawaii
  - KOGG (Wailuku satellite station)
  - KSIX-TV (Hilo satellite station)
- WEAU in Eau Claire, Wisconsin
- WHO-DT in Des Moines, Iowa
- WNYT in Albany, New York
- WREX in Rockford, Illinois
- WTHR in Indianapolis, Indiana
- WVTM-TV in Birmingham, Alabama

== Formerly affiliated ==
- KBLU-TV/KYEL-TV (now KYMA-DT) in Yuma, Arizona / El Centro, California (1970 to 1991)
- KHAR-TV (now KYUR) in Anchorage, Alaska (1970 to 1971)
- KMO-TV (now KCPQ) in Seattle, Washington (1953 to 1954)
- KRDO-TV in Colorado Springs, Colorado (1953 to 1960)
- KSFY in Sioux Falls, South Dakota (1960 to 1983)
- KVAL-TV in Eugene, Oregon (1954 to 1982)
- WMBB in Panama City, Florida (1973 to 1982)
- WTVG in Toledo, Ohio (1948 to 1995)
