= UPN20 =

UPN20 may refer to one of several former UPN network affiliated TV stations that had broadcast on UHF channel 20:

- KIKU in Honolulu, Hawaii (now an independent station)
- KTVD in Denver, Colorado (now affiliated with MyNetworkTV)
- KTXH in Houston, TX (now a MyNetworkTV owned-and-operated station)
- WCCT-TV in Hartford, Connecticut (now affiliated with The CW)
- WDCA in Washington, DC (now a MyNetworkTV owned-and-operated station)
