= Morgan White =

Morgan White may refer to:

- Morgan White (radio DJ) (1924–2010), American radio disc jockey and TV actor
- Morgan White (gymnast) (born 1983), American gymnast
