= Hawaii News Now =

TV newsroom in Honolulu, Hawaii

- Website type: News website
- Available in: English; Spanish; Japanese
- Founded: October 26, 2009
- Headquarters: Honolulu, Hawaii, US
- Owner: Gray Media
- Creators: Raycom Media; KFVE, KGMB, KHNL
- Website: hawaiinewsnow.com
- Commercial: Yes
- Registration: No

Hawaii News Now (also abbreviated as HNN) is a news department shared by three television stations in Honolulu, Hawaii: CBS affiliate KGMB (channel 5), NBC affiliate KHNL (channel 13), and Telemundo affiliate KFVE (channel 6). The newscasts are produced by Gray Media, which owns KGMB, KHNL, and KFVE. It also has a partnership with KBFD, which uses KGMB's taped-on-the-field stories during KBFD's 11 p.m. Korean-language newscast with Korean language subtitles, and a radio partnership with KHKA.

== Background ==
KGMB's news department started shortly after it signed on the air in 1952, and had the highest-rated of the Honolulu market's newscasts for most of its first 25 years; after sports director Joe Moore joined KHON-TV (channel 2) in 1978, KHON overtook KGMB for the lead, with KGMB's newscasts placing either second or third in the ratings for the next three decades. KHNL had run newscasts intermittently since signing on as independent station KTRG in 1962, it formed its longest-running news department to date in April 1995 as a Fox affiliate with the launch of a 9 p.m. newscast (that was simulcast on KFVE until January 1996, when it became exclusive to the latter station); KHNL added newscasts at 5, 6 and 10 p.m. during the summer and fall of 1995, with the addition of a weekday morning newscast after it joined NBC on January 1, 1996.

The origins of the three stations sharing their resources stemmed from the August 18, 2009, announcement that MCG Capital Corporation (then-owner of KGMB) and Raycom Media (then-owner of KHNL and, at the time, KFVE) had entered into a shared services agreement with Raycom as the senior partner. The combined operation was based at the KHNL/KFVE studios on Waiakamilo Road in Honolulu; KGMB vacated its longtime home on Kapiolani Boulevard. Though non-news programming would remain in place, the three stations would have a single news department dominated by former KGMB personalities. The arrangement also saw a channel swap, with KGMB's call letters, CBS affiliation and programming moving from virtual channel 9 (UHF digital channel 23) to channel 5 (UHF digital channel 22) and the KFVE intellectual unit (including its MyNetworkTV affiliation) moving from 5 to 9.

The swap was structured so that the KFVE callsign was reassigned to the license held by MCG Capital for KGMB and the KGMB callsign was reassigned to the license held by Raycom for KFVE. In effect, Raycom swapped KFVE to MCG Capital in return for KGMB. In most cases, it would not be possible for one company to own two "big three" stations, since the Federal Communications Commission's duopoly rules do not allow common ownership of two of the four highest-rated stations in a market. However, the FCC only recognizes the ownership of facility ID's and not intellectual units; the overall viewership of KFVE, while on channel 5, fell outside the criteria defined by the FCC that would have otherwise barred a duopoly between KHNL and KGMB if facility IDs were traded as well.

The new unified newscasts, titled Hawaii News Now, launched on October 26, 2009. On that date, the two stations began to jointly produce and simulcast weeknight 5 and 10 p.m. newscasts, while KHNL moved its 6 p.m. newscast to 5:30. KGMB continues to air a separate weeknight 6 p.m. newscast. The only times when KGMB and KHNL do not simulcast news programming are on weekdays during the 7 a.m. hour when KHNL airs NBC's Today, at 5:30 p.m. when KGMB airs the CBS Evening News and at 6 p.m. when KHNL airs NBC Nightly News. Weekday morning and weekend shows are simulcast on the two stations, but are subject to preemption on one of the stations due to network obligations. The local news schedule on KFVE remains unchanged. On June 22, 2020, Hawaii News Now began to broadcast its successful digital newscast ‘This is Now’ on KHNL-TV weekdays at noon. ‘This is Now’ is hosted by HNN reporter/anchor Ashley Nagaoka and award-winning HNN producer/director Jonathan Jared Saupe.

In 2011, the Honolulu Star-Advertiser formed a partnership with Hawaii News Now to combine stories, investigative reporting, political news researching and polling of issues that affects Hawaiians.

In May 2020, CBS Sports Radio affiliate KHKA began simulcasting Hawaii News Now broadcasts, as it shifted to a part time News/Information/Sports hybrid format with addition of CBS News Radio programming.

== Controversy ==
The shared services agreement of the three stations resulted in the termination of all but four members of KHNL's on-air staff and all of the technicians for KHNL's morning show, KHNL News 8 Today when its newsroom merged with KGMB and the two began simulcasting newscasts on October 26, 2009. Seniority was guaranteed to technicians in the IBEW Local 1260 contract, but management stated that "new equipment nullifies any previous seniority", even though the technicians had installed and been operating the new equipment for over six months. The new hires had no prior experience operating the new equipment and had to be trained. Those let go had been with the station between 20 and 30 years, while those employed as little as six months were allowed to retain their jobs.

The combined merger, especially the newscasts in general, drew complaints from local media watchdog groups, who cite Raycom for trying to monopolize the market by operating three stations at once and limiting the editorial independence and viewer choices for news programming. This prompted several groups opposed to the merger such as Media Council Hawaii to file petitions with the Federal Communications Commission to end the arrangement.

Paul McTear, president of Raycom Media, has staunchly defended the SSA, stating it would "preserve three stations that provide important and valuable local, national and international programming to viewers in Hawaii." Further controversy over the SSA grew after a November 7, 2009, report in the Honolulu Star-Bulletin revealed that Raycom would pay MCG Capital Corporation $22 million (according to a filing with the Securities and Exchange Commission) – which, in effect, would constitute a sale of KGMB from MCG Capital to Raycom. Both companies did not mention any monetary exchanges during its August SSA announcement, only "assets." The FCC, in response to Media Council Hawaii's filing of an objection over the SSA, asked Raycom for detailed, unredacted agreements in relation to the SSA.

== Notable current on-air staff ==
Current on-air anchors, reporters, and weather team:

=== Anchors ===
- Dillon Ancheta – "This Is Now" anchor/producer
- Annalisa Burgos – weekend anchor
- Mark Carpenter – anchor/reporter
- Grace Lee – sunrise news anchor
- Stephanie Lum – news anchor
- Ashley Nagaoka – anchor/reporter
- Mahealani Richardson – news anchor
- Keahi Tucker – news anchor
- Steve Uyehara – sunrise news anchor

=== Reporters ===
- Allyson Blair – reporter
- Kyle Chinen – sports reporter
- Chelsea Davis – reporter
- Howard Dicus – business reporter
- Eddie Dowd – reporter
- Lynn Kawano – chief investigative reporter
- Casey Lund – sunrise reporter
- Jolanie Martinez – sunrise traffic reporter
- Jonathan Masaki – traffic reporter
- Jim Mendoza – reporter
- Billy V. – sunrise feature reporter
- Raquel Cano – reporter

=== Weather team ===
- Dan Cooke – meteorologist
- Ben Gutierrez – weather anchor
- Guy Hagi – weather anchor
- Jennifer Robbins – chief meteorologist

== Notable former on-air staff ==
- Augie T. – host
- Drew Davis – meteorologist
- Stacy Loe – host
- Taizo Braden – traffic reporter
- Drew Davis – meteorologist
- Ramsay Wharton – traffic reporter
