= KITV =

Television station in Honolulu

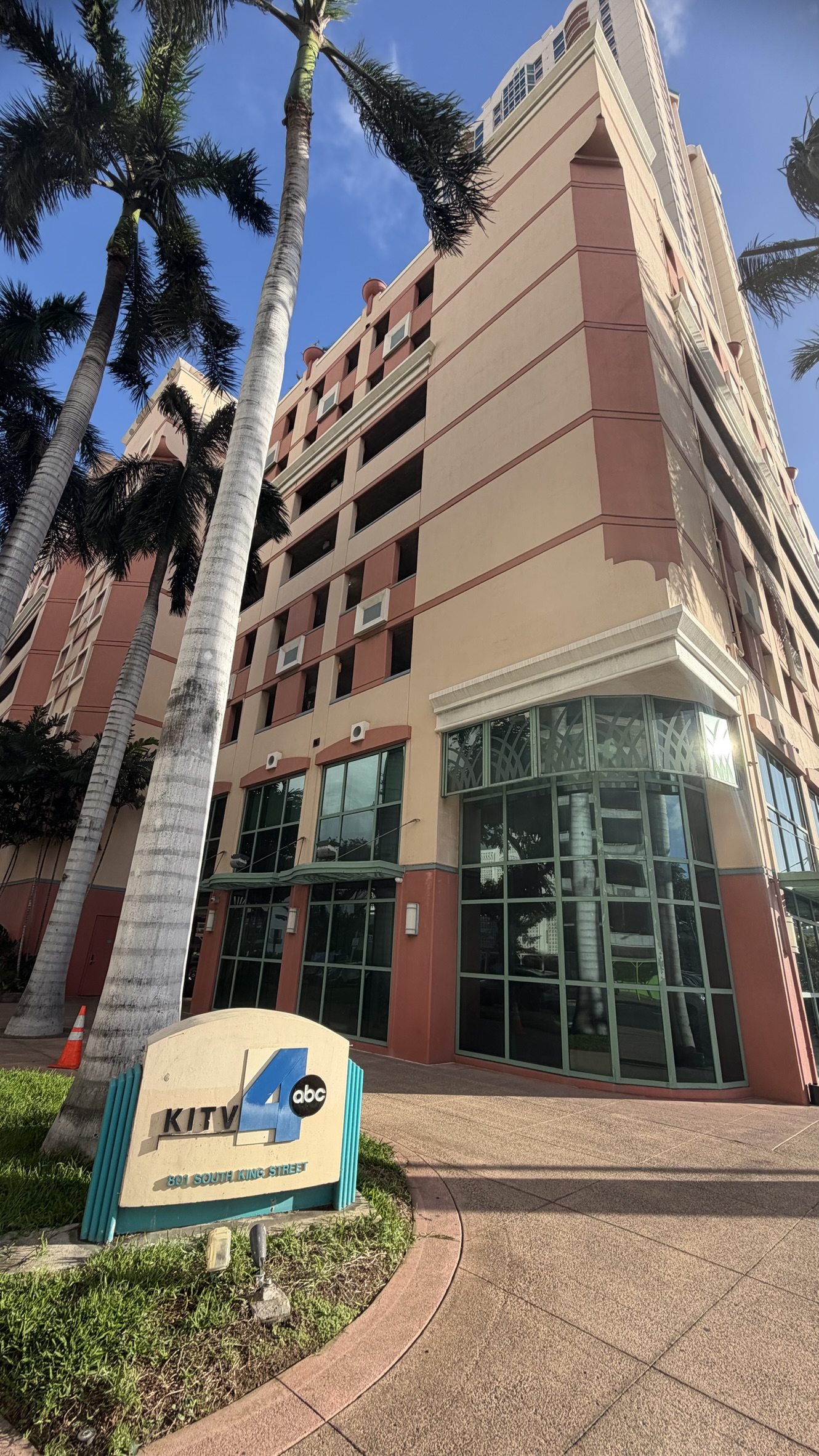
- KITV station sign at One Archer Lane
- Honolulu, Hawaii; United States
- Channels: Digital: 20 (UHF); Virtual: 4
- Branding: KITV 4; KITV 4 Island News

Programming
- Affiliations: 4.1: ABC; for others, see § Subchannels

Ownership
- Owner: Allen Media Group; (KITV, Inc.)
- Sister stations: KIKU

History
- First air date: April 16, 1954
- Former call signs: KABS-TV (CP, 1953); KULA-TV (1954–1958); KHVH-TV (1958–1973)
- Former channel numbers: Analog: 4 (VHF, 1954–2009); Digital: 40 (UHF, 1998–2019)
- Former affiliations: DuMont (secondary, 1954–1955)
- Call sign meaning: Island Television

Technical information
- Licensing authority: FCC
- Facility ID: 64548
- ERP: 41.1 kW
- HAAT: 54 m (177 ft)
- Transmitter coordinates: 21°17′25″N 157°50′24″W

Links
- Public license information: Public file; LMS
- Website: www.kitv.com

KITV (channel 4) is a television station in Honolulu, Hawaii, United States, serving the Hawaiian Islands as an affiliate of ABC. It is owned by Allen Media Group alongside KIKU (channel 20), a multicultural independent station. The two stations share studios on South King Street in downtown Honolulu; KITV's main transmitter is located atop the Ala Moana Hotel in Honolulu. Rebroadcasters on the islands of Maui and Hawaiʻi extend the station's signal.

Channel 4 was the third station established in Honolulu as KULA-TV in April 1954. It was constructed by Iowa-based American Broadcasting Stations, then-owner of radio station KULA, and affiliated with ABC from the start. Three years later, industrialist Henry J. Kaiser founded the city's fourth TV station, KHVH-TV on channel 13. Established in the same year as radio station KHVH (990 AM), it was an independent station that aired primarily movies and brought color television to the islands. Kaiser bought KULA-TV in 1958 and merged the two stations as KHVH-TV on channel 4. Its signal extended with a 1958 affiliation agreement with KMVI-TV, covering Maui from atop Haleakalā, and the 1960 construction of satellite station KHJK-TV—now KHVO—in Hilo on the island of Hawaiʻi.

Kaiser sold KHVH radio and television to Lawrence Berger in 1964 as he sought to move into broadcasting in the continental U.S. KHVH-TV brought Hawaii its first live television via satellite in 1966 and aired the first live programs between Hawaii and Japan. Berger kept KHVH radio and sold the television stations to Starr Broadcasting in 1973; channel 4 was renamed KITV. Under Starr, Shamrock Broadcasting, and Tak Communications ownership for the next 20 years, KITV languished as the market's third-rated news station but initiated live coverage of the Merrie Monarch Festival.

Tak wound up a years-long bankruptcy proceeding in 1995 by selling two of its stations, including KITV, to Argyle Television. Argyle—which merged with the Hearst Corporation in 1997 to form Hearst-Argyle Television—improved the quality and ratings of KITV's newscasts, which moved into second place from the mid-1990s through the mid-2000s. In conjunction with its move from studios on Ala Moana Boulevard to a new facility at One Archer Lane, KITV became the first television station in the United States to begin commercial digital broadcasts in January 1998. Hearst sold KITV to SJL Broadcasting in 2015. It was acquired in 2021 by Allen, which a year later purchased KIKU and restored its traditional format of Japanese- and Filipino-language programming.

== History ==
=== KULA-TV: Early years ===
Channel 4 was one of the first two channels to receive interest after the Federal Communications Commission (FCC) began taking applications for television stations to serve the Honolulu area on one of five commercial channels (2, 4, 9, 11, and 13). The Advertiser Publishing Company, publisher of the Honolulu Advertiser newspaper and owner of radio station KGU, applied for channel 4 in early June. Applications quickly piled up, especially for channels 2 and 4 in the low VHF band, seen as most desirable due to their propagation characteristics. Honolulu station KPOA, the Island Broadcasting Company, was the second applicant to seek channel 4. KPOA's filing was called "bad faith" by the Advertiser, which pointed out that two other channels were available and had not yet been filed for. KGU and KPOA both bowed out of the channel 4 fight at the same time in March 1953, when they each bought half the stock in Honolulu's struggling KONA-TV on channel 11 (which later became KHON-TV on channel 2).

One of the applications for channel 2 came from radio station KULA, which was in competition with a consortium known as Royaltel. KULA was sold in 1953 to American Broadcasting Stations (ABS), the owner of WMT in Cedar Rapids, Iowa, which filed in April 1953 for channel 4 in an effort to prevent KGU and KPOA from moving KONA from channel 11 to channel 4. Even while its purchase of KULA was still pending, the FCC granted channel 4 to ABS on May 14, 1953. After the commission approved its acquisition of KULA, it withdrew its application for channel 2 and began scouting studio sites for the new station. Originally designated KABS-TV, the channel became KULA-TV when it was transferred to the same subsidiary as KULA radio, the Pacific Frontier Broadcasting Company.

Construction of KULA-TV's studios and original transmitter site on Ala Moana Boulevard began in December 1953; the facilities would accommodate studios for KULA radio. KULA-TV began broadcasting on April 16, 1954. It was an affiliate of the ABC network, whose programs had previously appeared over KGMB-TV; KULA had been an ABC radio affiliate.

The ownership of KULA radio and television shifted several times in its early history. ABS sold the outlets to the Television Corporation of America, a new Hawaiian company headed by Jack Burnett and Albert Zugsmith, in 1955. The Crowell-Collier Publishing Company agreed to purchase all of the outstanding stock in the KULA stations in April 1956, which was canceled four months later when mortgage holders in the firm refused to permit the necessary stock swap.

=== KHVH-TV: Kaiser's channel 13 ===
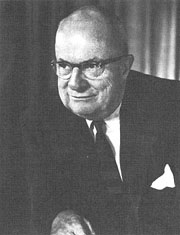
Henry J. Kaiser

Where channels 2 and 4 both received multiple applications, channel 13 was the last of Honolulu's original five TV allocations to receive any interested bidders, possibly because of fear of the number 13. Territorial Telecasters, a group linked to radio woman Christmas Early, filed for the channel in December 1952, only to abandon its bid within months and formally withdraw it in June.

In October 1956, industrialist Henry J. Kaiser applied for channel 13 after also requesting authority to build a new Honolulu radio station. Kaiser had been a dignitary at the launch of KULA-TV two and a half years prior. The FCC granted a construction permit in December, but KULA-TV protested, fearing the Honolulu market could not support an additional station and that it would face negative economic impacts from the sign-on of channel 13.

Hal Lewis, better known on the radio as J. Akuhead Pupule, was the executive vice president of the new Kaiser broadcasting operation in Honolulu. KHVH (990 AM) was approved in February 1957 and began broadcasting on March 15.

The FCC dismissed KULA-TV's challenge to the channel 13 permit on April 8, 1957. On May 5, KHVH-TV began broadcasting on channel 13. Airing from Kaiser's Hawaiian Village Hotel, it was the first station to broadcast color television in Hawaii. KHVH-TV was an independent station that lacked network affiliation or even a studio camera; it was primarily a movie station, scheduling three to four feature films a day.

=== KHVH-TV, channel 4: Merger ===
In May 1958, Kaiser announced the acquisition of KULA-TV; he would retain KHVH radio, with KULA being sold off to Jack Burnett. The two television stations merged as KHVH-TV on channel 4, retaining KULA-TV's affiliation with ABC and its studios on Ala Moana Boulevard, at midnight on July 15, 1958.

The late 1950s and early 1960s saw KHVH-TV's programming expand to the neighboring islands. Channel 4's programming began to be seen on Maui on the island's first TV station, KMVI-TV (channel 12) in Wailuku. The station, at the time independently owned by the Maui Publishing Company, had rebroadcast KONA-TV programs until KONA-TV set up its own repeater. Kaiser Industries constructed the station at Hilo, KHJK-TV on channel 13, which launched on May 15, 1960, from studios in the Naniloa Hotel.

By 1960, Kaiser's interests in Hawaii were diverse and far-reaching. In addition to the KHVH stations and the Hawaiian Village Hotel that was their namesake, he developed Hawaii Kai on eastern Oʻahu as well as a cement plant and a hospital. His influence led the Advertiser to ask in a December 1959 editorial, "Who's Running Hawaii?" Kaiser soon cast his gaze to broadcasting on the U.S. mainland. In 1962, he filed for stations in the UHF band in Chicago, Detroit, Los Angeles, San Francisco, and Burlington, New Jersey, near Philadelphia. His plans called for seven TV stations—the maximum one company could own at the time—with the stations in Honolulu and Hilo counting as two of the seven.

During Kaiser ownership, the station developed several local programs. Children's show Captain Honolulu aired from 1959 to 1969; Robert "Bob" Smith served as host under the "Sgt. Sacto" and Captain Honolulu characters before the show came to an end in 1969. (Note: The Captain [City] children's show format would later be used by other stations in the Kaiser Broadcasting chain, most notably at WKBD-TV in Detroit and WKBF-TV in Cleveland. WKBD's iteration also featured a host using the "Sgt. Sacto" name.) Other early local shows included Kaiser Sports Central, 50th State Wrestling, and the Tom Moffatt Show. Station manager John Serrao was transferred to Detroit in 1963 to help construct Kaiser's WKBD-TV and cited KHVH-TV's local programming successes when discussing WKBD's planned emphasis on local sports coverage and entertainment.

=== Western Telestations, Starr, and Shamrock ownership ===
Kaiser Industries announced the creation of Kaiser Broadcasting, a dedicated subsidiary of the company, to house the firm's broadcasting interests in September 1964. The KHVH stations would not be among them for long. That October, Kaiser announced the $3 million sale of the KHVH stations and KHJK-TV to Lawrence S. Berger, who had experience running stations in Wyoming and Montana. The transaction also included a construction permit for an FM radio station. The acquisition of KHVH-TV and KHVO—the former KHJK—by Berger's company, Western Telestations, was completed in December.

KHVH-TV was the first Hawaiian television station to air live pictures from the continental United States. Using the Lani Bird satellite, channel 4 brought viewers a college football game between Michigan State and Notre Dame on November 19, 1966. During halftime, viewers in the U.S. saw sunbathers on Waikiki's beaches; in addition, KHVH fed film from the Vietnam War to the ABC and NBC networks. KHVH-TV also originated the first live broadcast from Hawaii to Japan and aired the first live television program produced in Japan to be seen in Hawaii, as well as nationally aired coverage of ceremonies commemorating the 25th anniversary of the attack on Pearl Harbor.

Berger accepted an offer from the Starr Broadcasting Company of New Orleans to sell KHVH-TV in March 1971; Berger would have bought KHVH radio from Western Telestations in a concurrent transaction. The deal fell apart that August, but Starr agreed to acquire KHVH-TV in November 1972. The sale closed on August 1, 1973; with the KHVH stations now under separate owners, channel 4 changed its call sign to KITV, for Island Television. Berger would later regret not holding on to the television stations; in 1979, he said, "It was a mistake as far as money, at least. Who knew ABC would end up with Happy Days instead of the junk stuff we had in those days?"

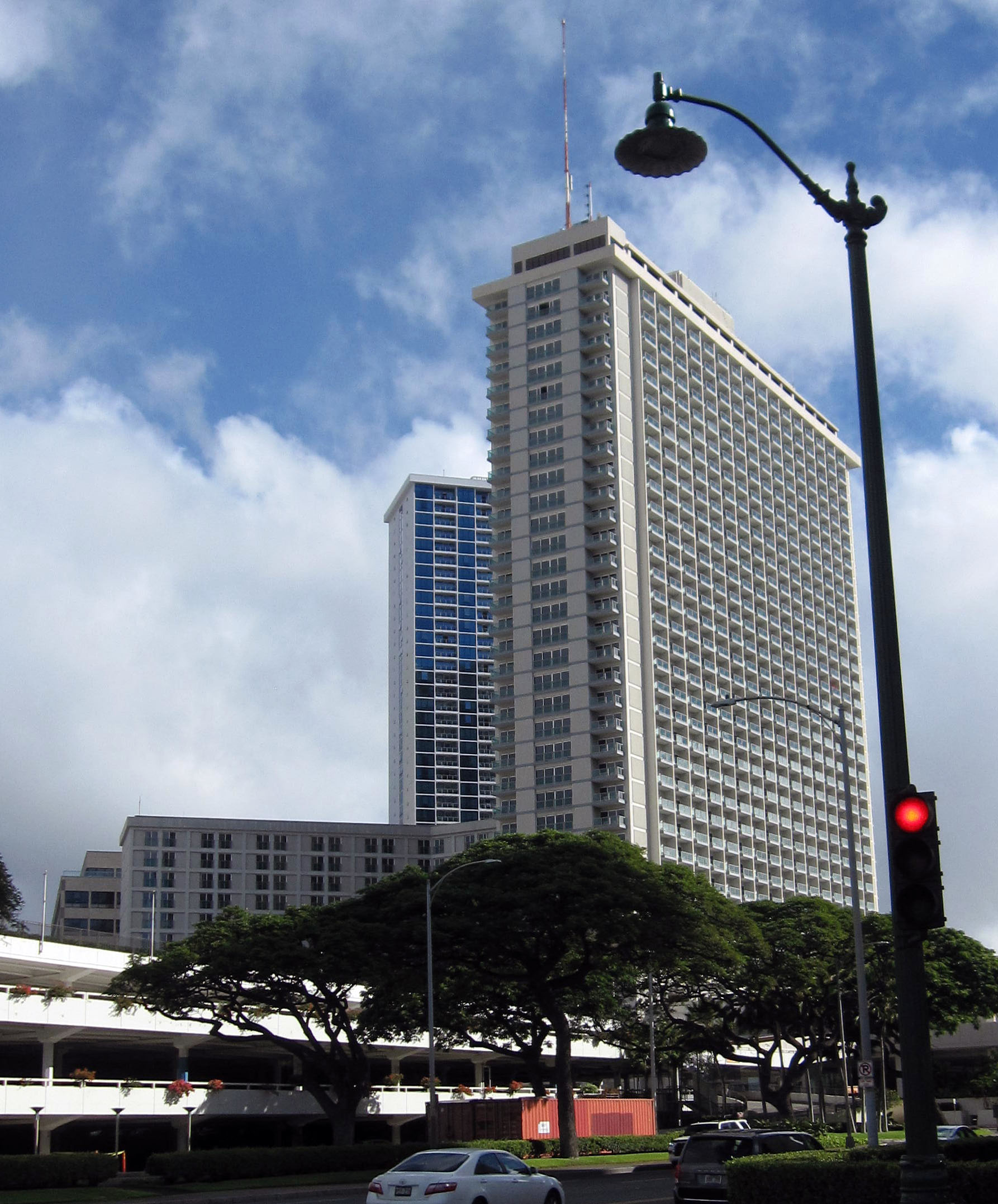
KITV moved its transmitter and antenna to the Ala Moana Hotel in 1977.

Under Starr, two changes were made in KITV's transmission setup. In early 1977, channel 4 switched to an antenna atop the Ala Moana Hotel, which improved reception for viewers in Waikiki shaded from the original 371-foot (113 m) tower by a new condominium building but not some viewers on windward Oʻahu. The company purchased KMVI-TV on Maui from its owner, Pacific Media Group, in 1978; it changed its call sign to KMAU after the sale.

The Starr stations were acquired by Shamrock Broadcasting, a company founded by Roy E. Disney, in a deal announced in May 1978 and approved by the FCC in May 1979. The merger of Starr and Shamrock came after LIN Broadcasting made a higher offer that required more divestitures, with the two satellite stations of KITV a complicating factor. Under Shamrock, KITV endured a two-month-long strike by the American Federation of Television and Radio Artists (AFTRA) that began on November 3, 1980. On that date, eight on-camera employees walked off the job, claiming that general manager Dick Grimm had refused contract negotiations for four years. During the strike, public officials including governor George Ariyoshi, Honolulu mayor Frank Fasi, and other state and city leaders refused to speak to reporters from KITV, and the city prosecutor filed a complaint in district court accusing the station of hiring strikebreakers. Shamrock planned new studio facilities for KITV in 1986, but they were not built, and the station remained on Ala Moana Boulevard, where the station televised the annual Aloha Festivals parade as it passed by.

Grimm brought many local broadcasts to KITV. In the mid-1970s, University of Hawaii Rainbow Wahine women's volleyball was added to the station's lineup at a time when the team was among the top squads in the nation. A University of Hawaii football game aired in 1974 as a favor for the ailing former governor, John A. Burns; the university arranged telling the NCAA that the game was a sellout as required by television rules of the time to allow Burns to see the game on TV. Most notable, however, was the Merrie Monarch Festival in Hilo; Grimm successfully petitioned organizer Dottie Thompson, initially reticent, to allow a telecast. Originally in the form of an edited highlight package, live coverage debuted in 1984, and KITV held the rights to the festival through 2009, after which it was outbid by KFVE.

=== Tak ownership ===
Shamrock was not planning to sell KITV but received and accepted a $50 million offer from Tak Communications, owner of television stations in Wisconsin and a radio station in Illinois, in 1986. One of the first changes under the new ownership was the switch to same-day broadcast of prime time entertainment series and soap operas with stations in the continental U.S., a practice that KGMB and KHON had adopted with CBS and NBC programming three years earlier. KITV did not switch at that time because of the cost of equipment to receive and delay the satellite feed for later rebroadcast.

Tak nearly sold KITV to Anthony Cassara, a television executive who had made several attempts in preceding years to buy Hawaii TV stations, in 1989; the company agreed in June to sell 60 percent of the station to a firm headed by Cassara, but the deal fell apart in October as the buyers were unable to secure financing.

Tak Communications struggled financially for a significant portion of its time owning KITV, having overpaid in a hot market for stations. In October 1990, its lenders—a group of East Coast banks—sued to force the appointment of a receiver. After reaching an accord with the lenders, Tak filed for Chapter 11 bankruptcy in January 1991. During bankruptcy, the station remained profitable and, with bankruptcy court approval, bought new equipment and replaced the roof on its studios. Tak's creditors sought in December 1992 to take control of the company; Michael Eskridge, the founder of CNBC, became the operating agent. The original reorganization plan failed when the FCC did not approve the transfer, possibly because of objections filed to the transfer of the four Tak TV stations in Wisconsin.

=== Argyle/Hearst ownership ===
Argyle Television II offered $146 million and received court approval to purchase KITV ($51 million) and WGRZ-TV in Buffalo, New York, from Tak in February 1995. The bid for KITV beat out a $50 million offer by Freedom Communications. In August 1997, Argyle merged with the Hearst Corporation's broadcasting unit to form what was then known as Hearst-Argyle Television. The name continued until 2009, when the Hearst Corporation acquired Argyle's stake in the venture, took it private, and renamed it Hearst Television.

Argyle began planning to move the station to more modern quarters. In 1998, KITV moved its operations from its longtime studios on Ala Moana Boulevard to its current location on South King Street (also known as One Archer Lane). The new facility, set up at a cost of $15 million, contained equipment sufficient to begin commercial digital broadcasting. From the start, Argyle opted to equip the facility with serial digital video connections, and as planning continued, the company opted to take the plunge with digital transmission. On January 15, 1998, KITV began airing a digital signal, giving it a claim to be the first U.S. TV station to commercially broadcast in the new format. KHVO in Hilo was the first station to be awarded a regular commercial construction permit for digital operations. KMAU also began broadcasting a digital signal, which was temporarily turned off to resolve interference issues with nearby scientific instruments. A second digital subchannel was configured but only broadcast color bars.

In 1999, KHON and KITV abandoned the practice known as "Hawaii time", where additional commercials were inserted into prime time but shows did not start on time, in favor of "clock time", where shows started at the same time they would on a U.S. mainland station. The practice had originated when entertainment programs were still taped and shipped to Hawaii for rebroadcast; the commercials defrayed the cost of transporting network material. By the late 1990s, it was causing advertising rates to be cheaper than otherwise. The switch to clock time had little effect on KHON and KITV, then the top two news stations in Honolulu, which remained in their ratings positions. All four network affiliates had adopted clock time by December 2002.

KITV, KHVO, and KMAU ended analog broadcasting on January 15, 2009, the date on which full-power television stations in Hawaii transitioned from analog to digital broadcasts. The transition in Hawaii had been brought forward from the original February 17 national switch date—itself later delayed to June—because of concern that the dismantling of existing transmitter towers atop Haleakalā would affect the mating season of the endangered Hawaiian petrel, which begins in February. KITV's digital signal remained on its pre-transition UHF channel 40, KHVO's digital signal relocated from channel 18 to channel 13, and KMAU's digital signal relocated from channel 29 to channel 12; all three stations switched to using virtual channel 4.

=== SJL and Allen ownership ===
On May 13, 2015, Hearst announced that it would sell KITV and its satellites to SJL Broadcasting; the deal marked the return of the company to Hawaii, as SJL (then known as Montecito Broadcast Group) formerly owned KHON-TV from 2006 until 2007. The sale was approved by the FCC on July 10, 2015, and completed on September 1, 2015. SJL sold the One Archer Lane studio site in 2016 under a long-term leaseback arrangement.

As a result of the 2016 United States wireless spectrum auction, KITV relocated its signal from channel 40 to channel 20 on April 12, 2019.

The $30 million sale of KITV to Los Angeles–based Allen Media Group, owned by Byron Allen, was announced on August 17, 2020, and completed on January 20, 2021. In 2022, Allen acquired KIKU (channel 20), a station that had traditionally broadcast Japanese- and Filipino-language programming but had been converted by its ownership to rebroadcasting the ShopHQ home shopping network in spite of public outcry. The sale was completed on January 31, 2022. The new ownership restored the prior format and about 75 percent of the previously aired programming.

On June 1, 2025, amid financial woes and rising debt, Allen Media Group announced that it would explore "strategic options" for the company, such as a sale of its television stations (including KITV and KIKU). One year later, the Office of Hawaiian Affairs came forward as a potential suitor, citing a desire to amplify the Native Hawaiian culture through mainstream media as the basis for exploring such a purchase.

== News operation ==
KULA-TV had newscasts from the start, with John Needham and John Galbraith as the station's first news presenters. In 1959, under Kaiser, channel 4 was the first local station with same-day news images, utilizing wire service photos fed by the International News Service; the other stations had to wait a day to process newsfilm. Present from the start of the station, initially as production manager, was Bob Sevey. Sevey left the station in 1957 to work for an ad agency, returned in 1961 as a news anchor, and departed in 1965 after Cecil Heftel poached him to run the KGMB-TV newsroom, where he immediately led that station to number one in the ratings. In the late 1960s, the station's news team featured Chuck Henry, who later went on to a career as an anchor in Los Angeles; Ken Kashiwahara, who spent 25 years as a correspondent for ABC News; and sportscaster Al Michaels. When Henry left for KABC-TV in 1971, his replacement was state senator Mason Altiery. The station sank to third in the ratings. In 1975, it tried a team consisting entirely of local newscasters; in the Advertiser, Bill Mann wrote that the newscasts were an "embarrassment", awkward, and riddled with mistakes. Two reporters, Don Baker and Tom McWilliams, sued, alleging they were fired for being White at a time when the station wanted a more diverse news team; a federal judge ruled against the lawsuit. Altiery, who at various times served as the news director of each of KHON-TV, KGMB-TV, and KHVH-TV, returned to channel 4 from 1975 to 1976.

Later in the 1970s, after the Shamrock purchase, KITV invested $1 million in improvements to its newscasts. It hired Jack Hawkins, a news anchor unfavorably compared by many to the fictional Ted Baxter and suffering from a credibility gap as a non-local newsman. From 1982 to 1984, KITV briefly presented its evening news at 5:30 and 9:30 p.m. while KGMB and KHON fought for viewers at 6 and 10; this arrangement was replaced with a more conventional late news schedule at 10 p.m. In 1987, KITV debuted a midday newscast. No matter the newscasts, the KITV news department was hemmed in by a smaller budget and staff than the other stations; in 1987, the station had an annual news budget of $1.1 million and 27 news employees, whereas KHON had a news budget of $1.9 million and 40 news staffers. After the 1980 strike, the station became a non-union shop and consequently offered lower pay to its workers, which resulted in higher turnover. Anchor Tina Shelton, who moved from KGMB to KITV in 1985 and remained at the station through 1999, commented that the reduced resources led KITV's newscasts to concentrate on police, courts, and government reporting. In 1989, when Anthony Cassara was under contract to buy KITV, he called it "under-managed".

The 1990s saw KITV become more competitive head-to-head with its rivals. In 1992, the station dropped its 5:30 p.m. early news and replaced it with separate 5 and 6 p.m. newscasts; it debuted a two-hour morning newscast in January 1996. The 5 p.m. newscast—anchored by the husband-and-wife team of Gary Sprinkle and Pamela Young—was a ratings success for the station; Young brought her Mixed Plate travel and features series with her to channel 4. In the first two decades of the program, which aired at one point or another on KHON, KGMB, and KITV, Young had produced 80 specials.

Overall, KITV moved from third place to second behind leader KHON, where it remained into the early 2000s as KGMB and KHNL inched closer. KGMB overtook KITV in late news by 2004, on its way to unseating KHON as the leading 10 p.m. newscast in 2006 for the first time in two decades. By 2015, the station's ratings had fallen further, with less than half the late news viewership of Hawaii News Now or KHON. Mixed Plate ended its run in 2016 after Young left the station to rejoin KHON.

In the wake of the 2006 Kiholo Bay earthquake on the island of Hawaii, KITV was unable to broadcast its signal but began producing and streaming its newscast online, the only local station able to do so. The stream received hundreds of thousands of views from around the world and was redistributed by the CNN Pipeline video news service. In 2010, the station added additional weekend morning and early evening newscasts.

By 2023, KITV produced 36 1/2 hours a week of local news programs.

On January 17, 2025, Allen Media Group announced plans to cut local meteorologist/weather forecaster positions from its stations, including KITV, and replace them with a "weather hub" produced by The Weather Channel, which AMG also owns. The decision was reversed within a week by management in response to "viewer and advertiser reaction".

=== Notable former on-air staff ===
- Paula Akana – evening news anchor, 1995–2020
- Kanoa Leahey – sports reporter and weekend news anchor, 1999–2004

== Subchannels ==
KITV transmits from atop the Ala Moana Hotel. The station's signal is multiplexed:

Subchannels of KITV
Subchannel	Res.	Short name	Programming
4.1	720p	KITV-HD	ABC
4.2	720p	MeTV	MeTV
4.3	720p	KITV-D3	Hawaii TV (Local news)
4.4	480i	StartTV	Start TV
4.5	480i	H&I	Heroes & Icons
4.6	480i	OCTV	One Caribbean Television

== Satellite stations ==
As with other major television stations in Hawaii, KITV operates multiple satellite stations across the Hawaiian Islands to rebroadcast the station's programming outside of metropolitan Honolulu.

Satellite stations of KITV
Station	City of license	Channel VC (RF)	Facility ID	ERP	HAAT	Transmitter coordinates	First air date	Public license information
KHVO	Hilo	4 (13)	64544	2 kW	−92 m (−302 ft)	19°42′49″N 155°8′3″W	May 15, 1960 (Note: KHVO used the call sign KHJK from 1960 until October 15, 1964. The letters stood for Henry J. Kaiser and were later assigned before launch to what became KBHK-TV in San Francisco.)	Public file; LMS
KMAU	Wailuku	4 (12)	64551	9 kW	747 m (2,451 ft)	20°39′25.5″N 156°21′35.8″W	December 4, 1955 (Note: As KMVI-TV. The station rebroadcast KONA-TV, which built KMVI-TV using the equipment discarded when it moved from channel 11 to channel 2 earlier that year. KONA built its own station on channel 7 at the same time that it changed to rebroadcast KHVH-TV. Channel 12 was owned independently from KITV until it was purchased in 1978 and changed its call sign at that time.)	Public file; LMS

Grade A signal contours for KITV, KHVO and KMAU; KITV (RF 20) Honolulu, Hawaii; KHVO (RF 13) Hilo, Hawaii; KMAU (RF 12) Wailuku, Hawaii
