= Paula Akana =

American journalist and nonprofit leader

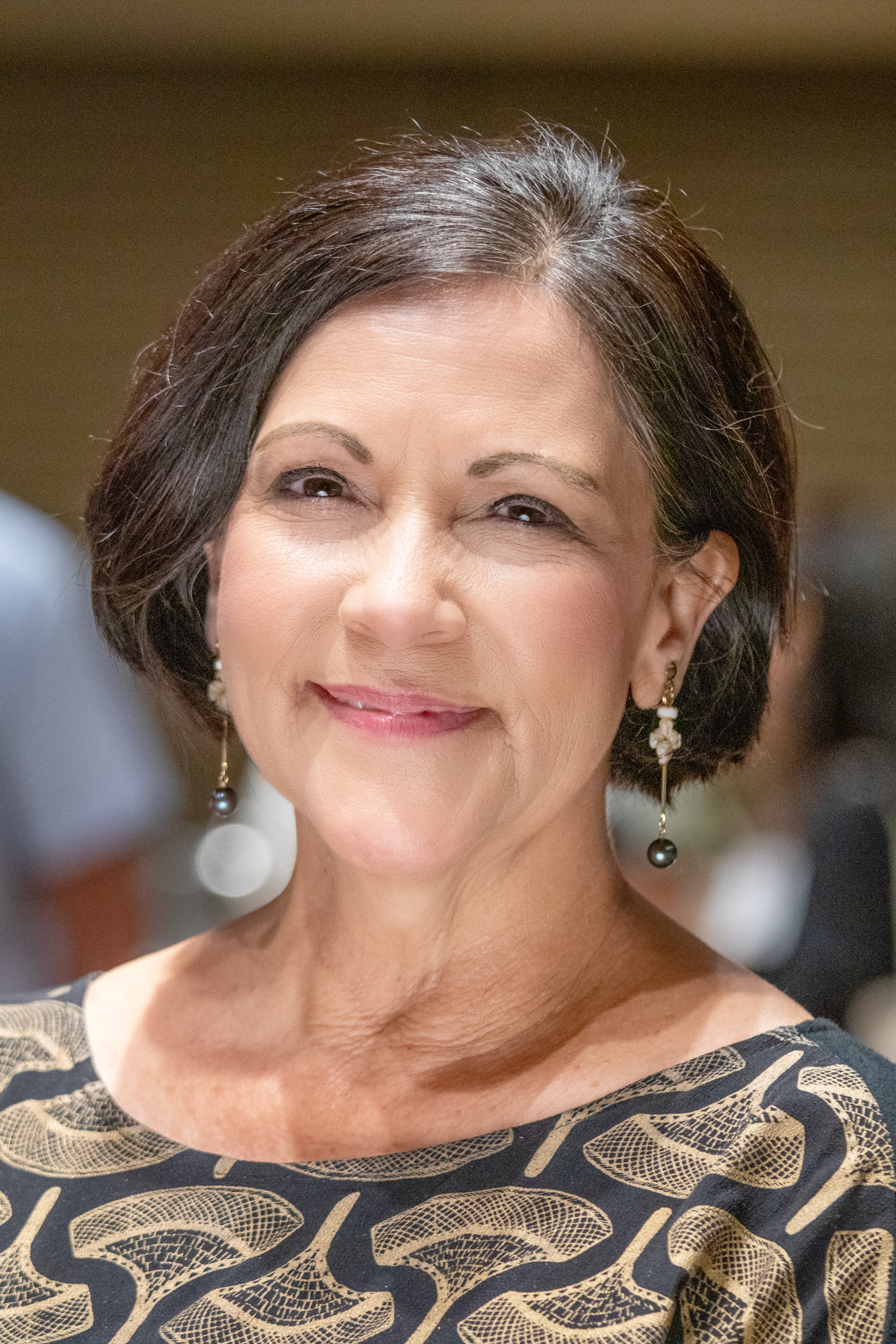
- Akana in 2022
- Born: 1961 or 1962 (age 63–64); Hawaii, U.S.
- Other name: Paula Akana Guanzon
- Education: Kamehameha Schools; University of Hawaiʻi at Mānoa (BA)
- Occupations: Journalist, nonprofit executive
- Employer(s): KITV (1983–2019); The Friends of ʻIolani Palace (2019–present)
- Title: President and CEO, The Friends of ʻIolani Palace
- Spouse: Robert Guanzon (m. 1986)
- Children: 2

Paula Akana (born 1961 or 1962), also known by her married name Paula Akana Guanzon, is an American journalist and nonprofit executive. She joined KITV as an intern in 1983 and stayed there for 35 years, anchoring its weeknight newscasts from at least 2002 until 2019, when she became president and CEO of The Friends of ʻIolani Palace, the nonprofit responsible for the palace's preservation and upkeep.

== Personal life and education ==
Akana was born in Hawaii in 1961 or 1962. She is a Native Hawaiian. She attended Kamehameha Schools, where she was a journalist for the school paper. She studied journalism and Hawaiian anthropology at the University of Hawaiʻi, graduating with a bachelor's degree. While in university, Akana was a member of the Polynesian Voyaging Society. She married Robert Guanzon in 1986 and the pair have two sons.

== Career ==
In 1983, Akana received an internship at KITV. She ultimately worked for the channel for 35 years and became one of the channel's primary on-air personalities. Akana was an anchor for the channel's weeknight broadcasts from at least 2002 until 2019, presenting alongside a variety of co-anchors over the years.

In 2019, Akana became CEO of The Friends of Iolani Palace, a nonprofit organization dedicated to the preservation and upkeep of ʻIolani Palace. Upon taking over the organization, her primary focus was on making repairs that had been delayed for years and on solving insect infestations in the palace grounds. At the time she started, the organization did not have an endowment and only had enough money to operate for a few more months. Under her leadership, the organization received a significant number of grants and has expanded their funding base.

In 2023, Akana temporarily returned to television, hosting K5's coverage of the Merrie Monarch Festival. In 2024 she was a founding member of the Hawaii Community Advisory Board, which helped manage the merger of Hawaiian Airlines and Alaska Airlines.
