= KHON-TV =

Television station in Honolulu

- Honolulu, Hawaii; United States
- Channels: Digital: 8 (VHF); Virtual: 2
- Branding: KHON 2; Hawaii's CW (2.2)

Programming
- Affiliations: 2.1: Fox; 2.2: The CW; for others, see § Subchannels

Ownership
- Owner: Nexstar Media Group; (Nexstar Media Inc.)
- Sister stations: KHII-TV

History
- First air date: November 16, 1952
- Former call signs: KAMI-TV (CP, 1952); KONA (1952–1965)
- Former channel number: Analog: 11 (VHF, 1952–1955), 2 (VHF, 1955–2009)
- Former affiliations: NBC (1952–1996); DuMont (secondary, 1952–1955); UPN (secondary, shared with KGMB, 2002–2004)
- Call sign meaning: Honolulu

Technical information
- Licensing authority: FCC
- Facility ID: 4144
- ERP: 7.2 kW
- HAAT: 17 m (56 ft)
- Transmitter coordinates: 21°17′28″N 157°50′8″W

Links
- Public license information: Public file; LMS
- Website: khon2.com

KHON-TV (channel 2) is a television station in Honolulu, Hawaii, United States, affiliated with Fox and The CW. It is owned by Nexstar Media Group alongside KHII-TV (channel 9), an independent station with MyNetworkTV. The two stations share studios at the Hawaiki Tower on Piikoi Street in downtown Honolulu; KHON-TV's main transmitter is also located downtown at the Century Center condominium/business complex.

== History ==
=== As an NBC affiliate ===
KHON-TV first signed on the air on November 16, 1952, as the first Hawaiian television station and a primary NBC affiliate, KONA, occupying the channel 11 position. It also had a secondary affiliation with DuMont (which it later shared with KULA-TV, now KITV, after it signed on in 1954) until that network's demise in 1955. The station was originally owned by Herbert Richards. Two years later in 1954, the Honolulu Advertiser purchased the station.

On October 16, 1955, KONA changed channels from 11 to 2 due to the lower VHF positions (2 to 6) having the most powerful ERPs at the time. The channel 11 frequency now belongs to PBS member station KHET. In 1956, KONA was sold to Pacific and Southern Broadcasting, the forerunner of Combined Communications. KALU signed on in 1958, with KALA following in 1961.

In 1965, all three stations' call letters were changed: KONA became KHON-TV, with KALA becoming KHAW-TV and KALU changing to KAII-TV.

In 1973, Pacific and Southern Broadcasting decided to spin off KHON to company president Arthur H. McCoy. The move was made so Pacific and Southern could merge into Combined Communications (which would itself merge with the Gannett Company six years later). Between them, the two companies were one station over the ownership limit of the time.

In 1979, KHON and Maui's KAII were sold to Western-Sun Broadcasting, a subsidiary of Cowles Communications; the Hilo satellite KHAW-TV was sold to Simpson Communications, but leased back to Cowles/Western-Sun. In 1985, KHON and KAII were sold to Burnham Broadcasting as part of the Cowles family's liquidation of most of its media assets; Burnham would acquire KHAW outright the next year, reuniting the stations.

Station logo from when it was an NBC affiliate. The Peacock is shown on this logo.

=== As a Fox affiliate ===
In March 1994, the Fox Broadcasting Company (then a division of News Corporation) entered into a partnership with minority-owned communications firm Savoy Pictures to form a television station ownership group called SF Broadcasting. On August 25, 1994, the company bought KHON, WVUE-TV in New Orleans and WALA-TV in Mobile, Alabama for $229 million; fellow sister station WLUK-TV in Green Bay, Wisconsin was sold to the company one month earlier in a separate $38 million deal, which for a time, was challenged by a Federal Communications Commission (FCC) petition filed by NBC alleging that the deal violated foreign investment limits for U.S. broadcasters (a fifth Burnham station, KBAK-TV in Bakersfield, California, was excluded from the SF deal and was instead spun off to Westwind Communications, a new company formed by several former Burnham executives). As part of the deal, all four stations (three NBC affiliates, including KHON, and one ABC affiliate) would disaffiliate from their respective network and become Fox affiliates. Fox was slated to control the voting stock in the venture, but prior to the sale's closure in 1995, it was determined that Fox would still hold an interest in SF although it opted not to have voting stock in the company. Savoy Pictures controlled the day-to-day operations of the four stations.

On January 1, 1996, KHON-TV switched its affiliation to Fox (and changed its on-air branding to "Fox 2"); the NBC affiliation moved to former Fox affiliate KHNL (channel 13). Unlike the New World Communications-owned Fox affiliates that joined the network during the previous 18-month span, KHON ran Fox Kids programming on weekdays (until Fox discontinued the weekday block in December 2001, airing weekdays from 1 to 4 p.m. and then from 2 to 4 p.m. until the fall of 2001 when it was moved to 10 a.m. to noon) and Saturday mornings (until November 2008, when 4Kids Entertainment ceased programming Fox's children's block, with the network discontinuing its children's programming altogether). KHON also expanded its local news programming on weekdays, seeing an increase in newscast ratings with the affiliation switch. KHON currently has the distinction of having the highest-rated local news programming of any Fox affiliate nationwide, and also declares itself as "America's No. 1 Fox affiliate", though the network's Miami affiliate WSVN makes this claim as well. Neither station mentions Fox in its logo or branding; when KHON was rebranded to KHON 2 in 2004, it became the first Fox station to ditch the network's brand standardization for its stations while it was still an affiliate. KHON is one of a handful of Fox affiliates that omit network references in their branding.

KHON-TV 1996–2004 logo.

On November 28, 1995, Silver King Communications (operated by former Fox executive Barry Diller) announced that it would acquire Savoy Pictures; as a result, Savoy Pictures and Fox ended their partnership and sold the SF Broadcasting stations, including KHON-TV, to the USA Networks division Silver King Broadcasting. Silver King, which later became known as USA Broadcasting, owned several stations on the United States mainland that were affiliated with the Home Shopping Network, which was also owned by USA Networks. The sale of KHON and the other SF stations was approved and finalized in March 1996, with its other assets being merged into the company that November.

In 1999, KHON relocated from its longtime studios on Auahi Street and moved to their current studios on Piikoi Street. Also on April 1 of that year, USA sold all four of its Fox stations to Indianapolis-based Emmis Communications for $307 million in cash and stock, as part of a sale of its major network affiliates in order to concentrate on its formerly HSN-affiliated independent stations.

A year later in 2000, Emmis purchased CBS affiliate KGMB, effectively bringing Hawaii's two oldest television stations under common ownership, though both stations retained separate operations—unlike what would become the common operational structure of most duopolies. Emmis received a cross-ownership waiver to acquire KGMB as FCC duopoly rules prohibit two of the four highest-rated stations in the same market from being owned by one company.

From September 2, 2002, to October 31, 2004, KHON carried select UPN programming via a secondary affiliation shared with KGMB; each station aired programs from that network that the other station did not air. The two stations began carrying UPN programming in September 2002 after KFVE (which had been with UPN since its January 1995 launch) disaffiliated from the network to become a full-time affiliate of The WB (whose programming aired on KFVE in a secondary capacity since December 1998). KIKU, an independent station specializing in Japanese programming, became a secondary UPN affiliate on November 1, 2004, and remained with the network until its closure on September 15, 2006.

==== Sale to Montecito ====
On May 15, 2005, Emmis Communications announced that it would sell its 16 television stations in order to concentrate on its portfolio of radio stations. On September 15, Emmis sold KHON as well as CBS affiliate KOIN in Portland, Oregon, and NBC affiliates KSNW in Wichita and KSNT in Topeka, Kansas to the Montecito Broadcast Group (formerly SJL Broadcast Management) for $259 million; the sale closed on January 27, 2006. The acquisition resulted in one of the rare instances in which two stations operated in a duopoly were completely separated due to Emmis owning KHON and KGMB under a waiver.

Montecito planned to replace 35 of KHON's 111 employees with automation. KHON employees first learned of the plan on January 12, when general manager Rick Blangiardi notified the staff of his intent to resign once the sale was finalized. At a station staff meeting that afternoon, SJL announced the layoffs, which would take place in two phases over the course of two months. Anchor Joe Moore announced the plan at the end of that evening's 6 p.m. newscast, and stated his concern that the change would impact the station's ability to serve its viewers. Montecito responded on January 15, assuring the public that no reporters or anchors would be affected, and the 6 p.m. newscast would be largely unchanged from the viewer's perspective.

The purchase of KHON was scheduled to close on January 26; however, Montecito was unable to complete the purchase of KHON that day, due to a mix-up in paperwork. As a result, Emmis announced that no employees would be fired as a result of the sale until at least March 31, and that Emmis would pay additional benefits to the affected employees. Moore used the last minutes of the 6 p.m. newscast, the final newscast under Emmis' ownership, to bid farewell to Blangiardi (who continued to manage KHON's former sister station, KGMB) and to criticize Montecito. Among other charges, he claimed that the layoffs were tantamount to "the butchering of an already lean work force" and accused Montecito of being a "virtual company" with no physical offices. Montecito's chief operating officer, Sandy Benton, disputed the charges, saying that "what was said last night was not the truth".

Since the purchase, KHON's new general manager, Joe MacNamara, changed the scope of the terminations: instead of a number of people to fire, a salary goal was given. Eight of KHON's nine managers resigned over three days, each stating that they could not support Montecito's decision to terminate employees (only the chief engineer remained). The managers involved, including Blangiardi, denied that the mass exodus was planned. Montecito continued to stand by the automation plan, pointing out that most of the markets it had entered have seen ratings increases as a result of Montecito management.

On June 28, 2006, Moore appeared to take another on-air dig at Montecito's automation plan. For two weeks, a noticeable echo could be heard during the newscast. At the start of that night's 10 p.m. newscast, it prompted Moore to stop and ask the technical crew if the problem could be fixed. A visibly disgusted Moore, who then blamed the new automated system, said "We're going to go to commercial. We're going to get this straightened out because I'm fed up with this crap." When the newscast returned, the problem was fixed, and Moore resumed as normal. Moore, who was rumored to be considering leaving KHON as a result of the sale, decided to remain as the station's chief anchor. In a February 6 email sent to staff members, Moore wrote, "How could I possibly work for owners I do not respect? After much deliberation, I reached this conclusion ... the owners are not KHON-2. We, the people who work here are KHON-2. I would not be working 'for the owners'. I would be working 'for our viewers', and 'with' fellow employees I deeply respect. I have decided not to let our owners drive me out of KHON-2."

==== Sale to New Vision Television, then LIN Media ====
On July 24, 2007, Montecito announced the sale of all of its stations (KHON, KOIN in Portland, KSNW in Wichita and its satellites, and KSNT in Topeka) to New Vision Television. On November 1 of that year, New Vision officially took over ownership of the stations.

On May 7, 2012, LIN Media announced its acquisition of the New Vision stations for $330.4 million and the assumption of $12 million in debt. The FCC approved the sale to LIN on October 2, and the group deal was consummated ten days later on October 12, 2012, reuniting KHON-TV and its Oregon and Kansas sister stations with several former Emmis-owned stations which had been purchased by LIN seven years earlier, such as WALA-TV, WLUK-TV and Albuquerque, New Mexico's KRQE.

==== Sale to Media General, then Nexstar ====
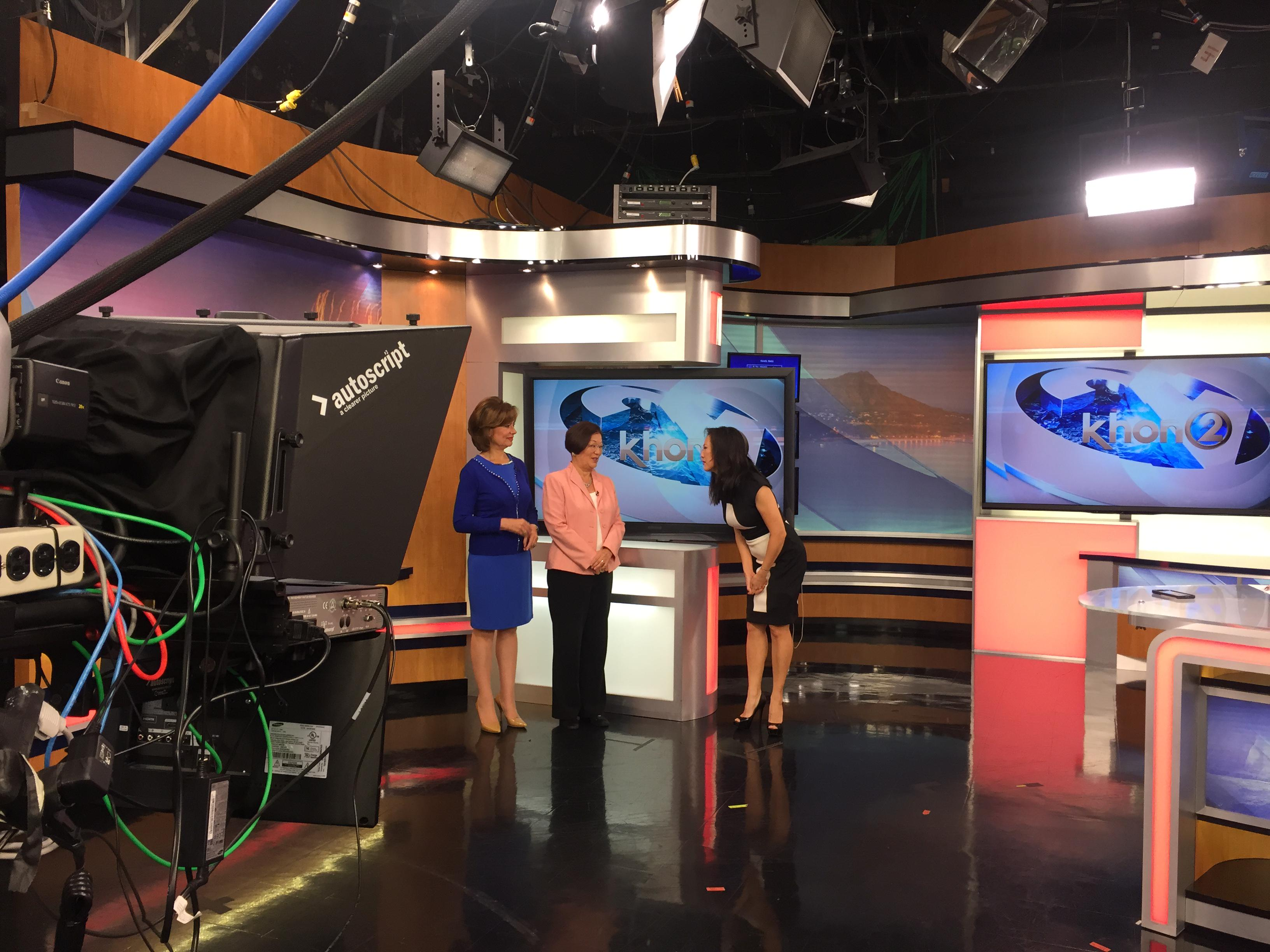
Senator Mazie Hirono on KHON-TV in 2015

On March 21, 2014, Media General announced that it would purchase LIN Media and its stations, including KHON-TV, in a $1.6 billion merger. The merger was completed on December 19. KHON was the only LIN-owned Fox affiliate affected by the SF Broadcasting deal that was retained by Media General, as WALA and WLUK were respectively sold to the Meredith Corporation and Sinclair Broadcast Group to resolve ownership conflicts with existing Media General stations in the Mobile and Green Bay markets (WVUE had previously been sold to the Louisiana Media Company in 2007, and has since transferred that station's operations to what is today Gray Television, which also owns KGMB/KHNL; WVUE reunited with WALA in 2021 following the latter's acquisition by Gray, along with the rest of the Meredith Local Media division, and, as a result, the two stations remain as the only Burnham/SF stations under common ownership).

On January 27, 2016, Nexstar Broadcasting Group announced that it had reached an agreement to acquire Media General and its stations, including KHON-TV, with the sale being completed on January 17, 2017, marking Nexstar's first entry into Hawaii.

== KHON-DT2 (Hawaii's CW) ==
KHON-DT2, branded Hawaii's CW, is the CW-affiliated second digital subchannel of KHON-TV, broadcasting in 720p high definition on channel 2.2.

=== History ===
On October 23, 2006, KHON-TV was announced as the Honolulu affiliate of The CW, carrying the network on its second digital subchannel. Beginning in March 2006 (two months after the network's launch was announced), The CW had struggled to find an affiliate in Honolulu after the market's then-WB affiliate KFVE, which was seen by many as the likeliest candidate to join The CW, signed with competing network MyNetworkTV, and former UPN affiliate KIKU (which aired the network's programming in the afternoons) declined to take the CW affiliation.

The network premiered on KHON's main channel on October 24 and 25 with airings of the regular CW schedule before moving to digital channel 2.2 on October 30; this was possible due to Fox's World Series coverage airing live at 2 p.m. Honolulu time, freeing up prime time. On December 11, 2006, Oceanic Time Warner Cable began offering KHON-TV's CW subchannel on digital cable channel 93; until the fall of 2011, the subchannel used its cable channel position within its branding.

KHON-DT2 presently clears The CW's entire schedule, including its Saturday morning block. However, the subchannel had aired The CW's Sunday night lineup an hour off-schedule, from 5 to 10 p.m. until the Sunday lineup was dropped and the hours given to its affiliates in September 2009. The subchannel is also available locally on DirecTV and Dish Network; the '93' in the subchannel's branding was removed for this reason, as its channel numbers are different on those providers, and was later dropped by KHON across the board on both Oceanic Time Warner and Hawaiian Telcom (on cable channel 3), going with only "Hawaii's CW" for that same reason. On August 20, 2007, "Hawaii's CW" began airing the nationally syndicated morning news program The Daily Buzz. The show's former home in the Honolulu market, KGMB, dropped the show three days earlier on August 17 in favor of a local morning newscast titled Sunrise on KGMB9, which launched on September 17. Unlike KGMB, which only aired the first two hours of The Daily Buzz, "Hawaii's CW" aired the entire three-hour broadcast each weekday from 5 to 8 a.m. Upon the sudden cancellation of The Daily Buzz in mid-April 2015 by its distributor, the channel switched to a simulcast of KHON's morning news in full.

Incidentally, KHON was a secondary affiliate of one of The CW's predecessor networks, UPN, from 2002 to 2004—at a time when secondary affiliations were more common and the advent of digital subchannels was not as widespread as it is today. "Hawaii's CW" does not have its own website; the only mentions of the subchannel on KHON's website are in the station's programming schedule and a link to The CW's website.

== Programming ==
When it was an NBC affiliate, channel 2 carried most of the network's lineup. The only exception was The Today Show, which the station had preempted since its sign-on due to the program being telecast live at 7 a.m. Eastern (which is 2 a.m. Hawaii time during standard time and 1 a.m. Hawaii time during daylight saving time, which Hawaii does not observe) and Hawaii's geographical location, making it difficult to deliver a taped broadcast to the islands. As a result, the station would not start its full day of programming until at least 7 a.m., usually with ethnic programming, cartoons, and from 1966 to 1972, an hour of Romper Room. In 1968, KHON would finally air a one-hour taped version of Today but would then drop it a year later. It finally began airing the full two-hour program via same-day satellite in 1972.

For most of its first 30 years on the air, KHON aired the NBC schedule on one-week tape delay, with some shows airing out of pattern. For instance, it aired the NBC Nightly News after 12 midnight or 6 a.m. the following morning via air mail. The Saturday morning schedule aired on Sunday morning, and Meet the Press aired on Saturday morning on a one-week delay. It would not be until 1985 when KHON would start airing NBC programming on the same day in the same timeslots as the U.S. mainland thanks to advances in satellite technology.

Since its switch from NBC in 1996, KHON clears the entire Fox network schedule. As of 2020, KHON also airs the syndicated infomercial block Weekend Marketplace on Sundays, making the station one of the few Fox affiliates that airs both Xploration Station and Weekend Marketplace. Most other Fox stations carrying Xploration Station air the block instead of Weekend Marketplace. The station presently airs Fox's Sunday night programming one hour later than other affiliates, from 7 to 10 p.m. Hawaii Time (all other stations start Sunday prime time at 6 p.m.), and the network's Animation Domination HD late night lineup on Saturdays aired a half-hour later airing at 10:30 p.m., due to its nightly 10 p.m. newscast. In 2014, KHON launched a half-hour prime time newscast at 9 p.m. on weekdays, followed by a second-run syndicated program, while network programs air in that hour on Sundays (syndicated programs may air in place of network shows if Fox airs a sporting event that is scheduled for prime time on the U.S. mainland, but due to the time differences between Hawaii and the continental United States, airs on KHON earlier that day).

KHON's CW subchannel aired weekly CFL broadcasts for the 2007 season after former University of Hawaii star quarterback Timmy Chang earned a backup spot with the Hamilton Tiger-Cats in the pre-season. The station airs preseason games and special programming of the Las Vegas Raiders via a deal signed between the team and KHON owner Nexstar Broadcasting. The Raiders feature Hawaii native (and 2014 Heisman Trophy winner) Marcus Mariota. The station aired Tennessee Titans preseason games supplied via the team's primary affiliate (and sister station through Media General) WKRN-TV when Mariota played in Tennessee.

For over a decade, both Jeopardy! and Wheel of Fortune aired on KHON. Jeopardy! was then moved to CBS affiliate KGMB in 2002 in order for KHON to begin a 5 p.m. newscast, which makes Honolulu one of the few markets where Jeopardy! and Wheel of Fortune air on separate stations.

=== News operation ===
KHON-TV presently broadcasts 37 hours of locally produced newscasts each week (with seven hours each weekday, and one hour each on Saturdays and Sundays); in regards to the number of hours devoted to locally produced newscasts, it has the largest newscast output of any television station in the Hawaiian Islands. When it switched to Fox, KHON maintained a news schedule similar to what it offered as an NBC affiliate. This resulted in KHON being the only news-producing Fox affiliate—indeed, the only Fox station that ran any local news programming—that did not air a prime time newscast. Hawaii's local stations use the same prime time scheduling as network-affiliated stations in the Central, Mountain and Alaska time zones in the continental U.S. While most Fox stations in these time zones generally air their late evening newscasts at 9 p.m., instead KHON airs its late newscast at 10 p.m., competing against KITV, KGMB and KHNL instead of only competing with KFVE (whose 9 p.m. newscast is produced by the joint Hawaii News Now operation also involving KFVE sister stations KGMB and KHNL). On September 8, 2014, KHON launched its first 9 p.m. weeknight newscast, which is 30 minutes in length. This marked the first time KHON aired news programming in prime time since it was an NBC affiliate, when its Eyewitness News began its late evening broadcast at 9:30 p.m. to accommodate the delayed NBC schedule from 1972 to 1980. KHON's 10 p.m. newscast will continue in the same time slot.

KHON's newscasts have been the highest-rated in Hawaii for almost 40 years. Even when the station's news operation branded itself as "Fox 2" from 1996 to 2004, its newscasts were still titled Channel 2 News (the name it had used since the early 1980s) rather than Fox 2 News. For the same reason, its late newscast did not change the title to The Ten O'Clock News like with other Fox stations.

The station's dominance has been especially pronounced since it lured KGMB sports anchor Joe Moore to become its lead anchor in 1979. Moore, billed as "Hawaii's most watched television newscaster," remains the station's lead anchor. In addition to his duties on the 6 and 10 p.m. flagship newscasts, he also anchors Hawaii's World Report at 5:30, a round-up of world and national news reports from CNN and Fox News. Moore is frequently the subject of controversy, but his popularity in the state usually prevents any attempts to rein him in.

As of 2012, KHON was the only major U.S. network-affiliated television station in Hawaii that had yet to make the upgrade to high definition or 16:9 enhanced definition widescreen local newscasts (KITV (channel 4) upgraded its newscasts to widescreen that year), as well as one of two LIN Media television properties that has yet to broadcast its local programming in high definition or widescreen (the other being WLFI-TV). On March 23, 2012, KHON president and general manager Joe McNamara stated in a New Vision Television press release that "in the coming months, additional changes will be taking place inside our (KHON) studios with state-of-the-art HD upgrades of cameras, lighting and newsroom systems that will enhance our on-air look tremendously." On October 11, 2013, KHON became the last LIN-owned station to broadcast its newscasts in high definition with a new set and new logo. The debut was made during their 5 p.m. newscast. Included in the upgrade was a new logo and updated news music. The station uses the "Inergy" news music package by Stephen Arnold Music that was originally intended for stations owned by the E. W. Scripps Company; however, KHON uses a custom version with traditional Hawaiian instrumentation.

==== Notable current on-air staff ====
- Joe Moore – anchor

==== Notable former on-air staff ====
- Emily Chang – reporter (October 2003–September 2004)
- Bob Hogue – sports director
- "General" Les Keiter – sports director (1971–1993)
- Barbara Marshall – reporter/anchor for Action Line
- Tina Shelton – reporter

== Technical information ==
=== Subchannels ===
The stations' signals are multiplexed:

Subchannels of KHON-TV
Subchannel	Res.	Short name	Programming
2.1	720p	KHON-HD	Fox
2.2	720p	KHON-CW	The CW
2.3	480i	KHON-DB	Grit
2.4	480i	KHON-RW	MovieSphere Gold

Subchannels of KAII-TV and KHAW-TV
Subchannel		Res.	Short name		Programming
KAII-TV	KHAW-TV	Res.	KAII-TV	KHAW-TV	Programming
7.1	11.1	720p	KAII-HD	KHAW-HD	Fox
7.2	11.2	720p	KAII-CW	KHAW-CW	The CW
7.3	11.3	480i	KAII-GT	KHAW-GT	Great
7.4	11.4	480i	KAII-RW	KHAW-RW	Rewind TV

=== Analog-to-digital conversion ===
KHON-TV ended regular programming on its analog signal, over VHF channel 2, on January 15, 2009, the official date on which full-power television stations in the State of Hawaii transitioned from analog to digital broadcasts (almost five months before the June 12 transition date for full-power stations on the U.S. mainland). The station's digital signal remained on its pre-transition VHF channel 8, using virtual channel 2.

On that same date, KHAW-TV relocated its digital signal from UHF channel 21 to its former analog-era VHF channel 11; while KAII-TV relocated its digital signal from UHF channel 36 to its former analog-era VHF channel 7. K55DZ formerly broadcast in analog only, though it had applied with the FCC to operate a digital signal on channel 28.

== Satellite stations ==
As with other major television stations in Hawaii, KHON operates multiple satellite stations and translators across the Hawaiian Islands to rebroadcast the station's programming outside of metropolitan Honolulu.

Station	City of license	Channel	First air date	Call letters' meaning	ERP	HAAT	Facility ID	Transmitter coordinates	Public license information
KHAW-TV (Note: Was KALU until becoming KHAW-TV on July 9, 1965.)	Hilo	11 (VHF)	November 27, 1961	Hawaii	3.35 kW	30.5 m (100 ft)	4146	19°42′51″N 155°8′3″W	Public file LMS
KAII-TV (Note: Was KALA until becoming KAII-TV on August 23, 1965.)	Wailuku	7 (VHF) (Note: The FCC had originally intended to allocate VHF channel 7 to Honolulu as a non-commercial assignment. KALA was intended to broadcast on channel 8 but given authority to begin operation on channel 7; the owners of KGMB asked for the change in order to remove potential interference concerns for KGMB viewers on Maui and the Big Island.)	November 1958 (Note: The Broadcasting and Cable Yearbook says KAII-TV signed on November 17, while the Television and Cable Factbook says it signed on November 19; the FCC history card says the station began operating on November 21.)	Hawaii	3.69 kW	753 m (2,470 ft)	4145	20°39′27″N 156°21′39″W	Public file LMS

== See also ==
- Channel 2 virtual TV stations in the United States
- Channel 8 digital TV stations in the United States
