= KHNL =

Television station in Honolulu

- Honolulu, Hawaii; United States
- Channels: Digital: 35 (UHF); Virtual: 13
- Branding: KHNL; K5 (13.2); Telemundo Hawaii (13.6); Hawaii News Now

Programming
- Affiliations: 13.1: NBC; 13.2: Independent; 13.6: Telemundo; for others, see § Subchannels of KHNL

Ownership
- Owner: Gray Media; (Gray Television Licensee, LLC)
- Sister stations: KGMB, KFVE

History
- First air date: July 4, 1962
- Former call signs: KTRG-TV (1962–1967); KIKU-TV (1967–1984)
- Former channel numbers: Analog: 13 (VHF, 1962–2009)
- Former affiliations: Independent (1962–1986); Fox (1986–1996)
- Call sign meaning: Honolulu; "HNL" is also the IATA code for Daniel K. Inouye International Airport

Technical information
- Licensing authority: FCC
- Facility ID: 34867
- ERP: 25 kW
- HAAT: 629 m (2,064 ft)
- Transmitter coordinates: 21°23′52″N 158°6′0″W

Links
- Public license information: Public file; LMS
- Website: hawaiinewsnow.com; hawaiinewsnow.com/k5/

KHNL (channel 13) is a television station in Honolulu, Hawaii, United States, serving the Hawaiian Islands as an affiliate of NBC and Telemundo. It is owned by Gray Media alongside CBS affiliate KGMB (channel 5), a combination known as Hawaii News Now. The two stations share studios on Waiakamilo Road in downtown Honolulu; KHNL's transmitter is located in Akupu, Hawaii. KHNL is also rebroadcast on the island of Hawaiʻi, Maui, and Kauaʻi.

The present station on channel 13 began broadcasting July 4, 1962, as KTRG-TV, an independent station owned by the Watumull family. In 1967, Richard Eaton's United Broadcasting Company purchased the station. The call letters were changed to KIKU-TV and the format to primarily Japanese-language shows. In addition to serving Hawaii's Japanese-language community, the station gained notice in the wider market for its telecasts of sumo wrestling as well as tokusatsu series, particularly Android Kikaider (better known in Hawaii as Kikaida).

A general partnership of investors from California and Hawaii, as well as Japan's TV Asahi, acquired KIKU-TV in 1979. In 1981, channel 13 significantly reduced its Japanese-language broadcasting, though it continued to air programs in the language into the 1990s, and became a general-entertainment independent. Under the management of future Honolulu mayor Rick Blangiardi, in 1984 the station renamed itself KHNL; it then added coverage of University of Hawaiʻi athletics as well as an affiliation with Fox in 1986. A limited amount of Japanese-language programming continued to air into the early 1990s, shortly after the Providence Journal Company acquired the station.

In 1994, the acquisition of KHON-TV, Honolulu's number-one station and an NBC affiliate, by Fox-linked SF Broadcasting portended an affiliation switch, which ultimately took place on January 1, 1996, with KHNL changing from Fox to NBC. As a result, in April 1995, KHNL began airing nightly newscasts. Despite luring several high-profile names in local TV news, the station struggled to gain ratings. Providence Journal merged with Belo Corporation in 1997; Belo then divested KHNL to Raycom Media in 1999. Raycom led the consolidation of KHNL and KGMB's news into Hawaii News Now in 2009; the combination became a serious challenger to KHON-TV, primarily on the strength of KGMB's existing news viewership. Gray acquired Raycom in 2019.

== Channel 13 in the 1950s ==
Channel 13 was the last of Honolulu's original five TV allocations to receive any interest, even though channels 2 and 4 each had two applicants. Territorial Telecasters, a group linked to radio woman Christmas Early, filed for the channel in December 1952, only to abandon its bid within months and formally withdraw it in June.

In October 1956, industrialist Henry J. Kaiser applied for channel 13 after also requesting authority to build a new Honolulu radio station. The Federal Communications Commission (FCC) granted a construction permit in December, but this was stayed between January and April 1957 following a protest by KULA-TV (channel 4) on economic grounds.

On May 5, 1957, KHVH-TV began broadcasting on channel 13. Airing from Kaiser's Hawaiian Village Hotel, it was the first station to broadcast color television in Hawaii. KHVH-TV was an independent station that lacked network affiliation or even a studio camera; it was primarily a movie station, scheduling three to four feature films a day. In May 1958, Kaiser acquired KULA-TV; the two stations merged as KHVH-TV on channel 4, retaining KULA-TV's affiliation with ABC, at midnight on July 15, 1958.

== Early years ==
=== KTRG-TV: The Watumull years ===
David Watumull, through the Hawaiian Paradise Park Corporation, applied for channel 13 in March 1962. Simultaneously, Watumull purchased KOOD (990 AM) and changed its call letters to KTRG.

The construction permit was granted on April 27, 1962, and KTRG-TV began telecasting on July 4, 1962; it was more than five hours later than advertised due to technical difficulties with the transmitter and received an assist from the three other Honolulu TV stations to get on the air the first night. Studios were on Kalakaua Avenue. In addition to syndicated programs, KTRG-TV broadcast some local productions. One of these was high school quiz show The Challengers, which debuted in 1963 and was originally moderated by sportscaster Harry Kalas. Another was a local version of the children's program Romper Room. However, the station lost money and was operating on a part-time basis.

=== KIKU-TV: The Japanese-language years ===
Watumull filed in January 1966 to sell KTRG-TV to Richard Eaton, owner of the United Broadcasting Company, for an initially agreed sales price of $700,000 (later revised to $550,000); Watumull kept the radio station. Eaton's programming plans for channel 13 attracted scrutiny at the FCC, as he sought to convert channel 13 into a station broadcasting Japanese-language programming. In October, the commission designated the deal for a hearing on two issues: the proposed conversion to Japanese-language programming and Eaton's past record, as several other United stations had received short-term license renewals. The commission worried that Eaton would have difficulty controlling a station in far-flung Honolulu given the supervision issues that had arisen at other United stations. By January 1967, the station proposed a format consisting of 50 percent Japanese-language and 50 percent English-language programming. With the deal languishing, Hoover Tateishi, a longtime Hawaii broadcaster who had been part of Eaton's bid, resigned in order to program two hours a week of Japanese-language programs on channel 13.

While the FCC's ruling on the matter was pending, Friendly Broadcasting sued Hawaiian Paradise Park Corporation in May 1967, alleging that Watumull had broken his contract to sell KTRG-TV to Eaton and was talking with another party who wished to buy the station for a greater purchase price. Watumull claimed he was able to do so because the contract lapsed after a year without FCC approval. However, judge Cyrus Nils Tavares issued a ruling that June 30 that the sales contract was still binding. Hearing examiner Thomas Donahue ruled in favor of Eaton's purchase of KTRG-TV in July 1967, noting that Eaton's poor track record had come from his business model of converting the "dogs and cats" of stations into viable broadcast properties. The sale was then effectuated; after the sale concluded, Hawaiian Paradise Park sued its Washington attorney for malpractice.

Meanwhile, on October 1, KTRG-TV returned to the air as KIKU-TV, with Tateishi as general manager. The new call letters represented the Japanese name for the chrysanthemum flower.

I thought, this will do it. The plot was simple, the monsters were ugly, the actors were young, and the theme song was catchy.

— Joanne Ninomiya, on scheduling Android Kikaider on KIKU-TV's lineup

While remaining rooted in Japanese-language programming imported from Japan, KIKU-TV slowly broadened its appeal. In 1968, it began nightly telecasts of sumo wrestling; color telecasting began in 1969. The station introduced subtitles on its Japanese-language programs in 1970, which proved popular and expanded to having half of all programs subtitled by 1975. Another channel 13 specialty was children's programming; it aired such tokusatsu programs as Kamen Rider, Rainbowman, and Android Kikaider. The success of the latter was particularly noteworthy; the show beat Sesame Street in the ratings, and it was noted in an article in Time magazine. In 1971, the station moved from Kalakaua Avenue to studios on Puuhale Road.

== From Japanese to English ==
=== Mid-Pacific Television Associates ownership ===
In 1979, Mid-Pacific Television Associates was approved to buy KIKU-TV for $2.7 million; the general partnership featured two consortia of investors, one local and one headed by the Cushman family of San Diego, as well as Japanese network TV Asahi with a 20 percent stake. Despite the presence of TV Asahi in the ownership group, major changes in 1981 led the station's programming away from Japanese-language shows. On June 29, the station doubled the length of its broadcast day and switched to shows mostly in English as Hawaii's only general-entertainment independent station. Japanese programming remained at noon and 10 p.m., times when management believed its primarily older viewers would still tune in. The programming change was met with some dismay by senior citizens and the Japanese program at the University of Hawaiʻi at Mānoa (UH), but it also was in line with declining Japanese fluency and immigration in Hawaii. A 1998 journal article by Shinji Uozumi suggested that another reason was recent instability in the Japanese yen. Between January 1977 and October 1978, the yen strengthened, going from 271 to the dollar to 176 to the dollar and increasing the prices for Japanese programming as paid by the U.S. station. Joanne Ninomiya, who had been KIKU's general manager since 1969, left in January 1981 due to the proposed changes and then began a venture broadcasting Japanese-language shows on cable. In addition to syndicated programming and the remaining Japanese-language shows, channel 13 also began offering newscasts seven days a week on November 1, 1981. It increased its transmitter power, improving its signal. However, some viewers in the Japanese community refused to watch the station after removing much of the programming that catered to their needs. In a show of the impact KIKU had on non-Japanese-speaking viewers, a Hawaiian woman, A. T. Ko-Opuna, started an unsuccessful petition-writing campaign to urge the FCC to support expanded Japanese-language broadcasting on the station.

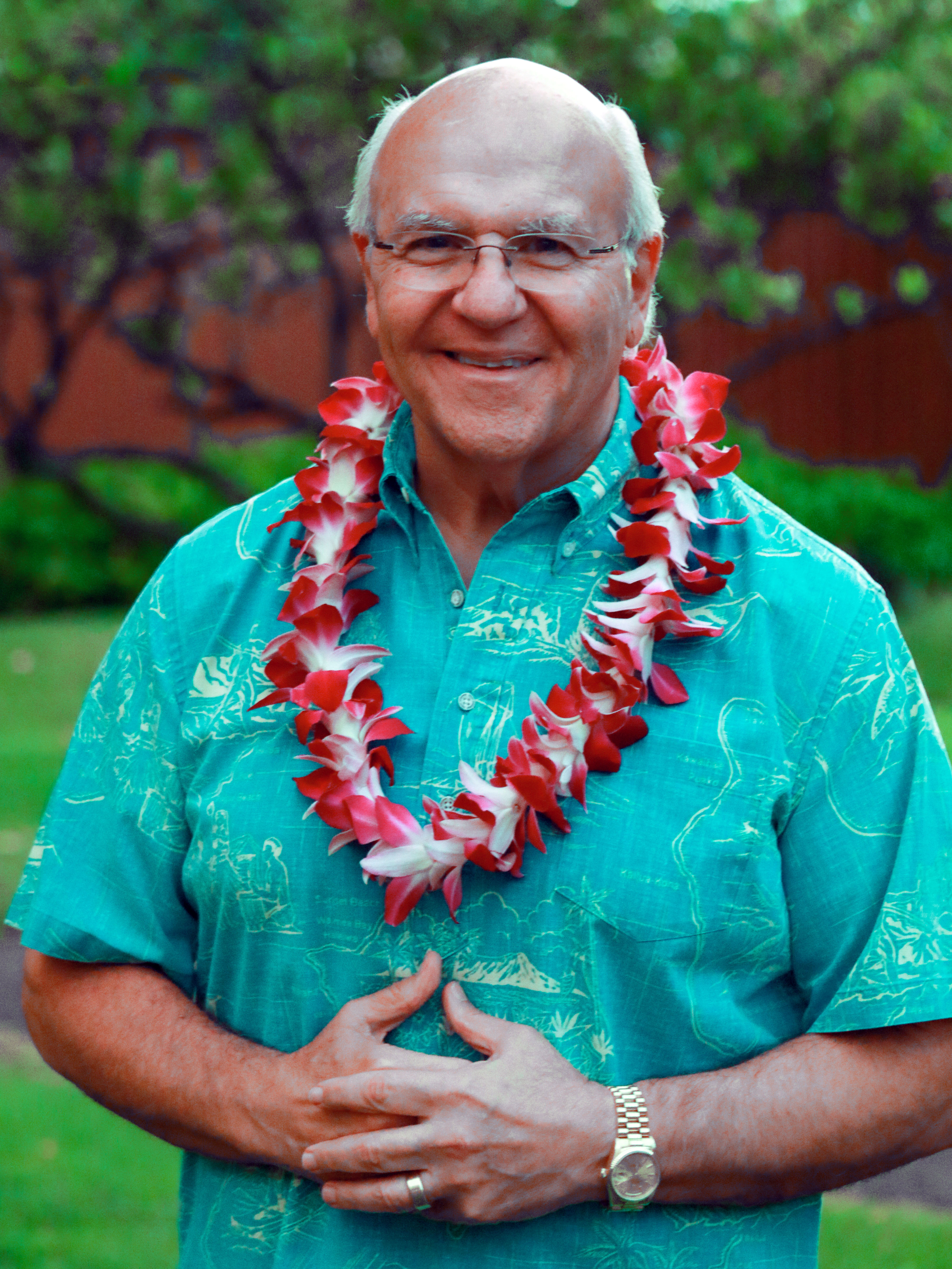
Rick Blangiardi served as general manager of KHNL from 1984 to 1989 and returned in 2008 when KGMB and KHNL consolidated.

The largest changes, however, came after Rick Blangiardi, a former University of Hawaiʻi assistant football coach who had worked at KGMB-TV, was named general manager in February 1984. Blangiardi fired 24 employees; he brought with him 13 employees from KGMB and increased the staff size from 48 to 54. The news department was immediately disbanded as a business decision, while programming was upgraded. Blangiardi also changed the station's call sign from KIKU-TV to KHNL, after Honolulu's airport code. Japanese-language shows continued to air from 10 p.m. to midnight, but other than that, the station was operating as a full-time general-entertainment independent that branded itself as a "news alternative" and the "free movie channel". KHNL also began a heavy schedule of local sports telecasts, including next-day broadcasts of University of Hawaiʻi football; sports brought viewers and increased advertising revenue. However, the station still lost money because it reinvested its profits in improvements, especially production equipment for remote sports broadcasts.

=== King Broadcasting ownership and Fox affiliation ===
In February 1986, the King Broadcasting Company of Seattle purchased KHNL from Mid-Pacific Television Associates at a time when the local investors who owned 30 percent of the station were facing financial pressures. It was King Broadcasting's first independent station, as it owned three NBC affiliates plus a CBS affiliate on the Mainland. After the King sale, Joanne Ninomiya returned to the station, particularly assisting with the introduction of subtitles to KHNL's long-running sumo telecasts. Her JN Productions also supplied six hours of Japanese-language shows on Sundays and a daily newscast from Japan.

KHNL became Hawaii's first affiliate of Fox in October 1986. The station also began expanding its reach with translators on Hawaii's other islands; by 1987, it was broadcasting on Maui and Kauaʻi, and in 1989, it began broadcasting its programs on KHBC-TV (channel 2) in Hilo, Hawaii, which King Broadcasting purchased after a previous attempt to operate the station on an independent basis failed the previous year. The Maui translator was replaced with full-power KOGG (channel 15), which began broadcasting from Haleakalā on August 22, 1989.

In 1992, the Providence Journal Company acquired King Broadcasting; Blangiardi, who had been promoted to running Seattle's KING-TV in 1989, was fired from his post there immediately. By this time, on the strength of Fox programming and UH athletics, the station was experiencing success. A Nielsen ratings study found it to be the fourth highest-rated independent station in prime time in the United States. Under Providence Journal ownership, the station rebranded to "Fox 13" in January 1993; later that year, it began programming KFVE "K5" (channel 5) under a time brokerage agreement. K5 became the new broadcaster for UH athletics in January 1994, providing additional opportunities for live broadcasts.

Japanese-language programming disappeared from KHNL's schedule in 1993 after JN Productions began programming KHAI-TV (channel 20), which already primarily broadcast shows in Japanese, and moved its cable programs there. That station then changed its call sign to KIKU.

== Switch to NBC ==
In August 1994, Burnham Broadcasting announced it would sell NBC affiliate KHON-TV (channel 2) and two other stations to SF Broadcasting, a joint venture between Savoy Pictures and Fox (the network owning a voting stock in Savoy), with the stations to switch their affiliations to Fox. However, the deal languished for months at the FCC because NBC was challenging the structure of SF's purchase of a fourth Burnham station, WLUK-TV in Green Bay, Wisconsin. KHNL announced in early November 1994 that it was setting up a local news department. On November 21, KHNL and NBC reached an affiliation agreement, with the effective date to be determined as part of the Burnham–SF transaction sale process. The news department launched on April 17, 1995, with the station rebranding to "Hawaii News8" and using its cable channel number instead of channel 13. The affiliation switch took place at midnight on January 1, 1996.

In 1997, Belo acquired the Providence Journal Company. However, it found that there was no synergy between KHNL and its clusters of stations in Texas, the Pacific Northwest, and the mid-Atlantic states and put the station up for sale, along with KASA-TV in Albuquerque, New Mexico, in May 1999. The Albuquerque and Honolulu operations were purchased by Raycom Media for $88 million. Raycom president John Hayes was familiar with KHNL, as he had been the vice president of television at the Providence Journal Company prior to its merger with Belo. With the November 1999 legalization of duopolies, Raycom acquired KFVE outright; the deal was approved on December 29, 1999, creating what Raycom called the first legal duopoly in the United States.

Digital broadcasting from KHNL and its satellites began with the launch of digital facilities for KHBC-TV in Hilo in May 2002. KHNL-DT in Honolulu was activated on January 1, 2003. In late 2008, KHNL relocated from its studios on Sand Island Access Road (Route 64/Route 640) and the Puuhale Road offices to a new facility on Waiakamilo Road. The move allowed KHNL to consolidate station operations in one facility; what had been KFVE's building prior to the 1993 operating agreement had housed the news department since its launch, while sales and back-office departments worked out of the Puuhale offices. PBS Hawaiʻi then moved into the building.

KHNL, KHBC-TV, and KOGG discontinued analog broadcasting on January 15, 2009, the date on which full-power television stations in Hawaii transitioned from analog to digital broadcasts. The transition in Hawaii had been brought forward from the original February 17 national switch date—itself later delayed to June—because of concern that the dismantling of existing transmitter towers atop Haleakalā would affect the mating season of the endangered Hawaiian petrel, which begins in February. All three stations opted to remain on their pre-transition digital channels of 35, 22, and 16, respectively.

== Consolidation with KGMB ==
On August 18, 2009, Raycom and MCG Capital Corporation (owner of CBS affiliate KGMB) entered into a shared services agreement (SSA) under which KGMB's operations, including its news department, would be combined with KHNL and KFVE in the latter's facility. KGMB and KFVE would effectively swap licenses and channel numbers, moving CBS programming to channel 5—which Raycom owned directly—while KFVE would move from channels 5 to 9 and fall under MCG Capital's ownership. The move would lead to the elimination of a third of the stations' combined staff.

The agreement came about primarily for economic reasons. Where the state's TV stations had taken in $68 million in revenue in 2008, the Great Recession was predicted to reduce that figure to $48 million in 2009. Raycom president and CEO Paul McTear noted that in light of an "economic reality ... that this market cannot support five traditionally separated television stations, all with duplicated costs", the agreement would preserve the operations of the three involved stations. He said the SSA would "preserve three stations that provide important and valuable local, national and international programming to viewers in Hawaii". The combined operation would reduce its headcount from 198 to 130; KGMB's management, including general manager Blangiardi, would run KGMB and KHNL. The structure of the deal, particularly the channel 5–9 swap seen as an end-run around a rule that prohibited common ownership of two of the four highest-rated stations in the market, led to criticism from media watchdog groups and a formal opposition being filed with the FCC. On October 26, 2009, KGMB and KHNL began presenting joint newscasts under the banner Hawaii News Now.

In November 2016, the Hawaii News Now stations and Raycom stations in 22 additional markets discontinued use of Nielsen ratings in favor of other methods of audience research. One reason was that, unlike larger Mainland markets, Honolulu was still measured by Nielsen by means of a diary system instead of meters that electronically track ratings habits. Of 11,400 diaries sent out in one Honolulu market survey, only 914 were returned.

=== Sale to Gray Television ===
On June 25, 2018, Atlanta-based Gray Television announced it had reached an agreement with Raycom to merge their respective broadcasting assets (consisting of Raycom's 63 existing owned-and/or-operated television stations, including KGMB and KHNL, and Gray's 93 television stations) under the former's corporate umbrella. In the cash-and-stock merger transaction, valued at $3.6 billion, Gray shareholders would acquire preferred stock currently held by Raycom. Because Raycom operated three stations in the Honolulu market, the companies were required to sell either KHNL, KGMB or KFVE to another station owner in order to comply with FCC ownership rules.

On November 1, 2018, Nexstar Media Group (owner of KHON-TV) announced that it would acquire KFVE and the licenses of former KGMB-TV satellites KGMD-TV and KGMV from American Spirit Media for $6.5 million. However, Raycom retained the K5 brand, call letters, and programming (except for KFVE's MyNetworkTV affiliation).

The sale of KFVE to Nexstar was approved by the FCC on December 17; the Gray-Raycom merger was approved three days later. The sale was completed on January 2, 2019. In part because of the merger and with a successor lined up, Blangiardi stepped down from running KGMB and KHNL in 2020 and mounted a successful campaign for mayor of Honolulu.

In 2026, KHNL and sister station KGMB acquired rights to Hawaii Rainbow Warriors and Rainbow Wahine athletics contests.

== News operation ==
=== Starting a newsroom ===
Even prior to signing an affiliation agreement with NBC, KHNL announced in November 1994 its intention to begin producing newscasts sometime in 1995. Providence Journal decided to make KHNL the first tapeless TV newsroom in the United States with all-digital editing equipment. While advertising was run immediately to search for news talent, the station made headlines within weeks by poaching top anchors and reporters from Hawaii's other television stations. The first was Dan Cooke, who had been anchoring the news at KITV since 1987. Another KITV employee soon followed: sports director Robert Kekaula, who as part of moving to KHNL would also become a presence on KFVE's UH athletics broadcasts. In total, KHON, KITV, and KGMB lost 16 on- and off-air staff to the new KHNL news operation. KHNL leased KFVE's Sand Island Road studios from its owner to provide space for the news department.

On April 17, 1995, Hawaii News8 launched with a prime time newscast at 9 p.m. The program was simulcast on KFVE and featured a fast-paced style. News broadcasts expanded that year with the addition of a 10 p.m. newscast on June 19, followed by the debut of a 5 p.m. newscast on July 24 and a 6 p.m. newscast on November 30. Upon joining NBC, the station added a two-hour weekday morning newscast from 5 to 7 a.m. on January 2, 1996. The station's newscasts, however, failed to find ratings success in spite of NBC's strength in entertainment programming in the late 1990s. By 1999, both Cooke and Kekaula had returned to KITV. In 2007, even though KFVE was still the official station of UH athletics, KHNL ceased airing regular sports segments in its newscasts and proceeded to lose both of its sportscasters.

KHNL also produced some newscasts specifically for KFVE. When KHNL became an NBC affiliate, K5 exclusively aired the 9 p.m. news, but it was canceled effective August 3, 1997, because of frequent sports preemptions and a lack of ratings and resources. A newscast in that time period was reinstated in 2004, and a 6:30 p.m. newscast on K5 was added in January 2008. On December 22, 2008, with the move to Waiakamilo Road, KHNL became the first television station in Hawaii to begin broadcasting its local newscasts in high definition; the KFVE newscasts were included in the upgrade.

=== Hawaii News Now ===
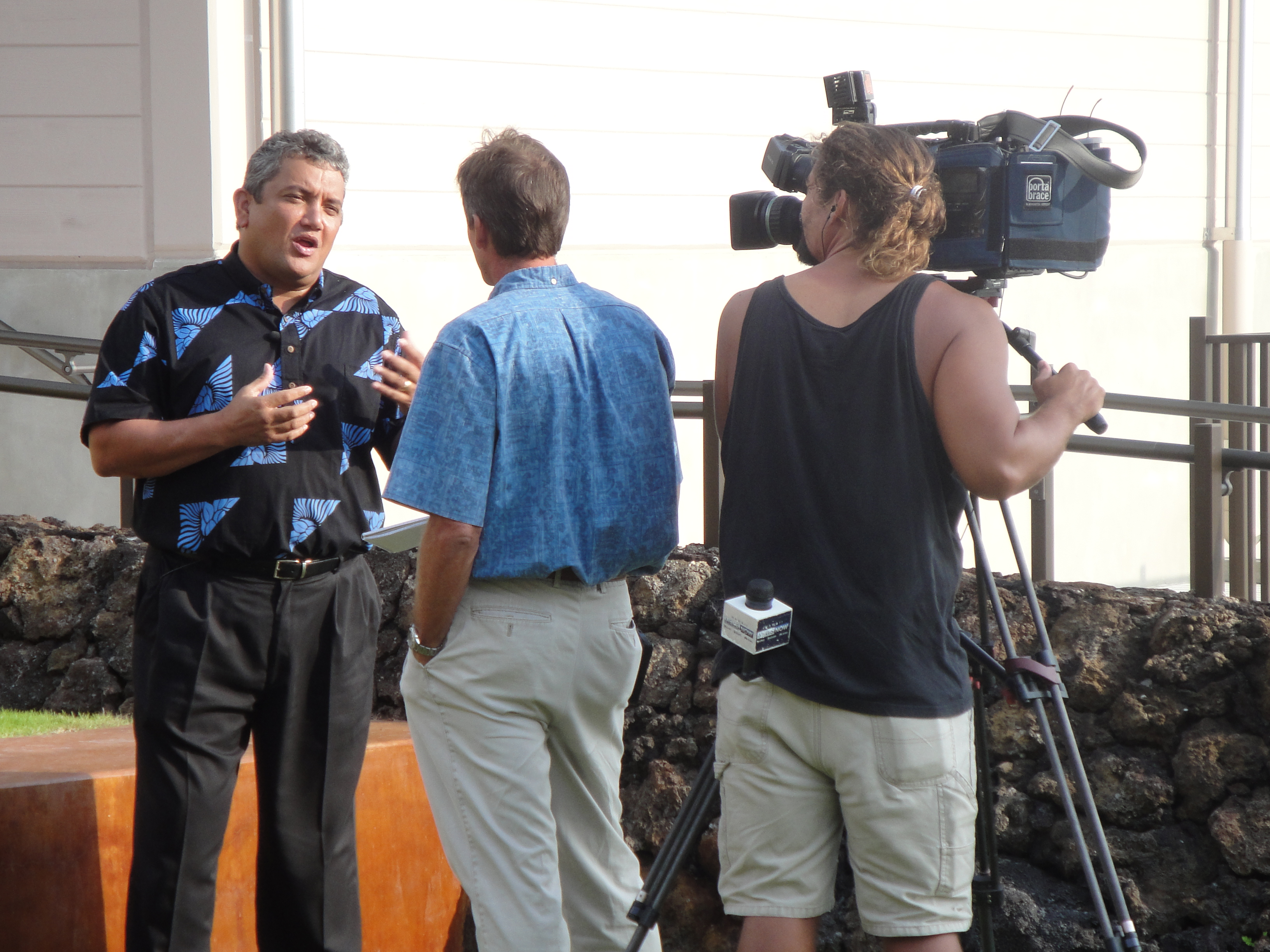
A Hawaii News Now crew interviews Hawaii County Mayor Billy Kenoi in 2011

After the consolidation of KGMB and KHNL news was announced, the combined newscast debuted as Hawaii News Now on October 26, 2009. The two stations changed the times of some of their early evening newscasts; both stations broadcast at 5 and 10 p.m. with KHNL presenting news at 5:30 and KGMB at 6 p.m. Most of the on-air personalities came from KGMB, with just four KHNL on-air employees remaining with Hawaii News Now. Wayne Harada, writing for The Honolulu Advertiser, noted that the choice of KGMB personalities likely owed to the ability to remove highly paid veterans from the combined staff and rely on KGMB's superior ratings image.

While the merger of newsrooms created a stronger competitor to KHON-TV in the ratings and sometimes eclipsed it in combined totals, most of the viewership was attributable to KGMB, not KHNL, and the two stations initially carried separate advertising during news simulcasts. KHON was able to claim it had the number one rating at times when KGMB only surpassed it with the addition of KHNL viewers.

=== Notable former on-air staff ===
- Maria Quiban – weather anchor (1995–1998)

== Technical information ==
=== Satellite stations ===
KHNL's transmitter in Akupu serves the metropolitan Honolulu area. As with other major television stations in Hawaii, KHNL operates satellite stations across the Hawaiian Islands to rebroadcast the station's programming outside of metropolitan Honolulu.

Satellite stations of KHNL
Station	City of license	Channel; TV (RF)	Facility ID	ERP	HAAT	Transmitter coordinates	First air date	Public license; information
KSIX-TV	Hilo	13 (22)	34846	8 kW	−170 m (−558 ft)	19°43′40″N 155°4′1″W	August 22, 1983	Public file; LMS
KOGG	Wailuku	13 (16)	34859	50 kW	818 m (2,684 ft)	20°39′25.5″N 156°21′35.8″W	August 22, 1989	Public file; LMS

KSIX-TV in Hilo and KOGG in Wailuku broadcast KHNL, K5, and KGMB:

Subchannels of KSIX-TV and KOGG
Subchannel	Res.	Short name	Programming
5.1	480i	Telemun	Telemundo
6.1	720p	K5	"K5" / KHNL-DT2 (Independent)
13.1	720p	KHNL-HD	NBC (KHNL)
13.3	720p	KGMB	CBS (KGMB)

KHNL is also rebroadcast on translator K32IX-D in Lihue.

Grade A signal contours for KHNL, KSIX-TV, KOGG and K32IX-D; KHNL (RF 35) Honolulu, Hawaii; KSIX-TV (RF 22) Hilo, Hawaii; KOGG (RF 16) Wailuku, Hawaii; K32IX-D (RF 32) Lihue, Hawaii

=== Subchannels of KHNL ===
Subchannels of KHNL
Subchannel	Res.	Short name	Programming
13.1	1080i	KHNL-DT	NBC
13.2	720p	K5	"K5" (Independent)
13.3	480i	Ant TV	Antenna TV (4:3)
13.4	480i	Grit	Oxygen
13.5	480i	Quest	Quest
13.6	480i	Telemun	Telemundo
13.7	480i	DEFY	Defy (4:3)
