= KGMB =

Television station in Honolulu

- Honolulu, Hawaii; United States
- Channels: Digital: 23 (UHF); Virtual: 5
- Branding: KGMB (general); Hawaii News Now (newscasts); Bounce TV Hawaii (5.4)

Programming
- Affiliations: 5.1: CBS; for others, see § Subchannels

Ownership
- Owner: Gray Media; (Gray Television Licensee, LLC)
- Sister stations: KHNL, KFVE

History
- First air date: December 1, 1952 (intellectual unit); February 7, 1988 (current broadcast facility)
- Former call signs: KGMB-TV (1952–1982)
- Former channel numbers: Analog: 9 (VHF, 1952–2009); Digital: 8 (VHF, 2002–2009); Virtual: 9 (2002–2009)
- Former affiliations: All secondary: NBC (December 1952); ABC (1952–1954); UPN (shared with KHON-TV, 2002–2004)
- Call sign meaning: Matched then-sister station KGMB (AM) (now KSSK)

Technical information
- Licensing authority: FCC
- Facility ID: 34445
- ERP: 23 kW
- HAAT: 629 m (2,064 ft)
- Transmitter coordinates: 21°23′52″N 158°6′0″W

Links
- Public license information: Public file; LMS
- Website: www.hawaiinewsnow.com

KGMB (channel 5) is a television station in Honolulu, Hawaii, United States, serving the Hawaiian Islands as an affiliate of CBS. It is owned by Gray Media alongside dual NBC/Telemundo affiliate KHNL (channel 13) and Kailua-Kona–licensed KFVE (channel 6), which relays KHNL's second and sixth digital subchannels. The stations share studios on Waiakamilo Road in Honolulu's Kapālama neighborhood; KGMB's transmitter is located in Akupu, Hawaii.

== History ==
The station first signed on the air on December 1, 1952, as the first television station in Hawaii. KGMB-TV was originally owned by J. Howard Worrall along with KGMB radio (AM 590, now KSSK) and operated from studios on Kapiolani Boulevard in Honolulu. The station carried programming from three of the four major networks at the time (excluding DuMont), but was a primary CBS affiliate owing to KGMB-AM's long affiliation with CBS Radio. The station lost NBC programming when KONA-TV (channel 2, now KHON-TV) signed on two weeks later, and lost ABC when KULA-TV (channel 4, now KITV) launched in April 1954. In 1973, a partnership led by future Hawaii congressman Cecil Heftel bought KGMB-AM-TV, then turned around and sold the KGMB stations to Lee Enterprises in 1977. Lee sold off the radio station in 1980. In 1982, the station dropped the "-TV" suffix from its call sign.

The real-life KGMB news crew was often featured in one of the longest-running police dramas on CBS in the 1970s, Hawaii Five-O. The station also had ties to the iconic series' reboot, as CBS allowed KGMB to let its viewers preview the season premiere episode early at the Waikiki Shell each September during the rebooted series' run.

Former KGMB logo, used from 2007 to 2009. In 2012, KGMB brought back the "9" logo for its 60th anniversary with the "9" flipping to a "6(0)" in promos.

In 2000, Lee exited from television broadcasting and sold most of its television holdings (including KGMB) to Emmis Communications. Emmis already owned KHON-TV, so it had to obtain a cross-ownership waiver for the purchase of KGMB from the Federal Communications Commission, to bypass the recently passed duopoly rules that forbid common ownership of two of the four highest-rated stations in a single market. This waiver was renewed several times while Emmis owned both stations. At that time, KHON moved its operations into KGMB's facility, though the two stations maintained separate news departments.

From September 2, 2002, to October 31, 2004, KGMB carried select UPN programming via a secondary affiliation shared with KHON; each station aired programs from that network that the other station did not air. The two stations began carrying UPN programming in September 2002 after KFVE (which had been with UPN since its January 1995 launch) disaffiliated from the network to become a full-time affiliate of The WB (whose programming aired on KFVE in a secondary capacity since December 1998). KIKU, an independent station specializing in Japanese programming, became a secondary UPN affiliate on November 1, 2004, and remained with the network until its closure on September 15, 2006.

Emmis itself prepared to exit the television industry and sold KHON to the Montecito Broadcast Group in 2006. Emmis then announced on February 20, 2007, that KGMB and its satellites had been sold to MCG Capital Corporation for $40 million, resulting in one of the rare instances involving a complete separation of a television station duopoly. The FCC approved the sale in late May and was completed on June 4, 2007. Shortly after MCG Capital Corporation took over, KGMB adopted a logo similar to the one it used in the early 1980s and also rolled out a new graphics package for its newscast and a new website.

For many years, KGMB billed itself as "One of the Good Things About Hawaii" with its rich history of local television programming exclusively in Hawaii, especially in such shows as Skipper Al and Checkers & Pogo (both children's programs; the latter being the most remembered, airing from 1967 to 1982 and featured Morgan White), The Hawaii Moving Company (originally a disco/dance program that transitioned into a general interest show), and the 1982 television special Rap's Hawaii starring Rap Reiplinger. This slogan was made famous by an a cappella jingle which is still heard on KGMB today. At the end of KGMB's morning newscast, Sunrise, it can now be heard leading into CBS Mornings. Later, with an emphasis on weather, the station branded itself "Hawaii's Severe Weather Station".

=== Channel swap ===
On August 18, 2009, MCG Capital and Raycom Media (owner of KHNL and, at the time, KFVE) announced a shared services agreement with Raycom as senior partner. As part of the deal, KGMB vacated its longtime studios on Kapiolani Boulevard; the combined operation would be based at KHNL/KFVE's studios on Waiakamilo Road. Though non-news programming would remain in place, news operations of the three stations would be combined into a single entity. The arrangement would also see a channel swap, with KGMB moving from virtual channel 9 (UHF digital channel 23) to channel 5 (UHF digital channel 22) and KFVE move from 5 to 9.

The resulting ownership arrangement of the stations generated some controversy, as it had the effect of Raycom trading KFVE to MCG Capital in return for KGMB. Organizations such as media watchdog group Media Council Hawaii viewed the plan as a way to circumvent FCC rules preventing one company owning two of the four highest-rated stations in the same market—in this case, KGMB and KHNL. However, the FCC only recognizes ownership of facility identifications, which remain attached to their channel numbers, and not ownership of a station's intellectual unit (call letters, programming, network affiliation, etc.). In this case, Raycom kept ownership of Facility ID 34445, now belonging to KGMB, while MCG Capital still owns Facility ID 36917, which now belonged to KFVE; the overall viewership of channel 5, as KFVE, fell outside the criteria that would have otherwise barred a duopoly between KHNL and KGMB if facility IDs were traded as well.

Raycom Media president Paul McTear staunchly defended the SSA, stating it would "preserve three stations that provide important and valuable local, national and international programming to viewers in Hawaii." Further controversy over the SSA grew after a November 7, 2009, report in the Honolulu Star-Bulletin revealed that Raycom would pay MCG Capital Corporation $22 million (according to a filing with the Securities and Exchange Commission) – which, in effect, would constitute a sale of KGMB from MCG Capital to Raycom. Both companies did not mention any monetary exchanges during its August SSA announcement, only "assets". The FCC, in response to Media Council Hawaii's filing of an objection over the SSA, asked Raycom for detailed, unredacted agreements in relation to the SSA.

The SSA and channel swap took effect on October 26, 2009, with KGMB moving from virtual channel 9 to channel 5 and changing its branding from "KGMB 9" to just "KGMB." An estimated 68 positions from a total of 198 between the three stations would be eliminated as part of the agreement. On May 8, 2010, the remaining items and memorabilia that were left at KGMB's former studios were auctioned off, with proceeds going to charity.

=== Removal from Nielsen ratings ===
Beginning in 2016, the Hawaii News Now (HNN) group of KGMB, KHNL, and KFVE severed ties to the Nielsen ratings. After the November 25 sweeps, Raycom opted to use other research to track KHNL and KGMB audiences. KFVE, owned by HITV, is affected also. In Hawaii, Nielsen does not use electronic means to track audiences. Recently, only 914 of the printed Nielsen booklets, known as monthly diaries, were completed out of 11,400 diaries. KITV and KHON will continue to use Nielsen ratings.

=== Sale to Gray Television ===
On June 25, 2018, Atlanta-based Gray Television announced it had reached an agreement with Raycom to merge their respective broadcasting assets (consisting of Raycom's 63 existing owned-and/or-operated television stations, including KGMB and KHNL), and Gray's 93 television stations) under the former's corporate umbrella. In the cash-and-stock merger transaction, valued at $3.6 billion, Gray shareholders would acquire preferred stock currently held by Raycom. Because Raycom operates three stations in the Honolulu market, the companies were required to sell either KHNL, KGMB or KFVE to another station owner in order to comply with FCC ownership rules.

On November 1, 2018, Nexstar Media Group – which has owned Fox affiliate KHON-TV since January 2017 – announced that it would acquire KFVE and the licenses of satellites KGMD-TV and KGMV from American Spirit Media for $6.5 million. Nexstar concurrently assumed the station's operations through a time brokerage agreement that took effect the day the transaction paperwork was filed with the FCC, under which Raycom forwarded the rights to certain managerial services involving KFVE – not counting certain other services to which Raycom would retain stewardship under the TBA – on a transitional basis. Under the deal, which is expected to receive regulatory approval in the first quarter of 2019, Nexstar also intends to integrate KFVE's operations into KHON's studio facilities at the Hawaiki Tower on Piikoi and Waimanu Streets. However, Raycom will retain rights to the KFVE intellectual unit (call letters, syndicated and local programming), which will be shifted to a digital subchannel of either KHNL or KGMB as will KFVE-DT2's Bounce TV affiliation (which will be moved to KGMB-DT4); the KFVE calls will also be retained by Raycom for branding continuity. As such, Nexstar will likely assign new call letters to the channel 9 license as well as acquire programming to replace that being maintained by Raycom post-acquisition (which may include shifting the programming on KHON's CW-affiliated DT2 feed to the KFVE license, and/or the retention of the MyNetworkTV affiliation, which Raycom did not include in the KFVE intellectual property transaction.)

The sale of KFVE to Nexstar was approved by the FCC on December 17; the Gray-Raycom merger was approved three days later. The sale was completed on January 2, 2019.

In 2026, KGMB and sister station KHNL would acquire rights to Hawaii Rainbow Warriors and Rainbow Wahine athletics contests.

== Programming ==
KGMB clears all CBS programming, although it will occasionally preempt prime time shows until the overnight hours in order to broadcast locally produced specials. In its early days, the only major CBS programs KGMB regularly preempted were Captain Kangaroo and the CBS Morning News, due to its morning broadcast of the popular in-house children's program Checkers & Pogo, which also aired in the afternoon. Like most of the other network-affiliated stations in Hawaii, KGMB had to shuffle CBS programs because the shows were flown in via air mail or shipped a week (or several weeks) after the programs aired in the U.S. mainland; the CBS Evening News in particular would often air at 12 midnight or later depending on how late the tape was in arriving from the East Coast.

For live events such as sports, KGMB picked up the signal from CBS affiliates in California, resulting in the station airing large numbers of Los Angeles Rams and San Francisco 49ers games. In 1969, this forced channel 9 to drop initial plans to carry the last game of the season between the Arizona Cardinals and Cleveland Browns when it discovered none of its pickup points were showing the game.

KGMB airs CBS' daytime programs in a very different order from the main network feed; this is because the station airs the lineup in the order that it arrives from the network, which for unknown reasons is different from that of most CBS affiliates. From September 14, 1998, to the September 18, 2009, conclusion of Guiding Light, air times included The Price Is Right at 10 a.m., The Bold and the Beautiful at 11:30 a.m. (following a half-hour infomercial at 11 a.m.), Guiding Light at noon, The Young and the Restless at 1 p.m., and As the World Turns at 2 p.m. In most other markets, Y&R aired first, followed by B&B, ATWT, and GL. Let's Make a Deal (CBS' replacement for Guiding Light) assumed the noon slot when it debuted on October 5, 2009, while The Talk (which replaced As the World Turns) took over the 2 p.m. time slot on October 18, 2010. The station also airs the weekday edition of CBS Mornings an hour later, from 8 to 10 a.m. local time, due to its morning newscast Sunrise airing until 8 a.m. On weekdays outside of network hours, KGMB airs syndicated first-run shows during the daytime and sitcom reruns overnight. On weekends during the Hawaii football season until 2012, and again from 2016 to 2020, normally after the 10 p.m. newscast on Sunday, KGMB aired a coach's show.

=== High definition ===
KGMB currently broadcasts most of its programming, including CBS network shows and sports events such as NFL and college basketball games, in full 1080i high definition. In the late 2000s, the station upgraded its servers to broadcast timeshifted programming in high definition such as CSI: Miami, The Unit, and the Late Show with David Letterman. The shows, which are received from the U.S. mainland in the afternoon, were previously recorded in standard definition before being rebroadcast in the evening. On January 14, 2008, KGMB's HD feed became available on Oceanic Time Warner Cable digital channel 1007. Prior to that date, it was the only major station in the market not available in HD on Oceanic. A temporary agreement was reached between KGMB and Oceanic Time Warner to carry Super Bowl XLI in high definition. KGMB also broadcasts some local programming in high definition, such as newscasts.

=== News operation ===
KGMB presently broadcasts 27 hours, 25 minutes of locally produced newscasts each week (with 5 hours, 5 minutes each weekday, and one hour each on Saturdays and Sundays). For its first 25 years on the air, KGMB was the dominant news station in Hawaii. However, in 1978, rival KHON-TV persuaded sports director Joe Moore to join that station as its lead anchor. Within a few years, KHON had passed KGMB for the lead, and KGMB has placed either second or third in the ratings since then.

From September 2005 to August 2007, KGMB aired the nationally syndicated morning show The Daily Buzz on weekdays from 5 to 7 a.m. Although that program runs three hours, the station only aired the first two hours; during this period, KGMB was the only "Big Three" affiliate in the United States that carried the show. The program was dropped on August 17, 2007, to make room for a new morning newscast titled Sunrise on KGMB 9, which launched on September 17. The Daily Buzz moved to KHON's CW-affiliated second digital subchannel on August 20; ironically, that show competes with KHON's own Hawaii's Morning News. In June 2007, KGMB built new studios and launched an updated website.

In 2008, the station announced plans to upgrade its news production to high definition. However, on December 13 of that year, KGMB announced that those plans had been put on hold due to the possibility of relocating its studio facilities. The station planned to begin producing its newscasts in widescreen standard definition as early as July 2009. With the launch of the Hawaii News Now operation on October 26, 2009, KGMB began broadcasting its local newscasts in high definition. KGMB and KHNL began to jointly produce and simulcast weeknight 5 and 10 p.m. newscasts, while KHNL moved its 6 p.m. newscast to 5:30. KGMB continues to have its own weeknight 6 p.m. newscast. The only times when KGMB and KHNL do not simulcast news programming are on weekdays during the 7 a.m. hour when KHNL airs NBC's Today, at 5:30 p.m. when KGMB airs the CBS Evening News and at 6 p.m. when KHNL airs NBC Nightly News. Weekday morning and weekend shows are simulcast on the two stations but are subject to preemption on one of the stations due to network obligations. The local news schedule on KFVE remains unchanged. There is no weekday midday news on either station. While the merged operation is based at KHNL's old studio, it is dominated by holdovers from KGMB; all but four of KHNL's reporters were fired after the merger.

==== Notable former on-air staff ====
- Larry Beil – sports anchor
- Carter Evans
- Neil Everett – sports anchor
- Russ Francis – sports anchor
- Joe Moore – sports anchor

== Technical information ==
=== Subchannels ===
The station's signal is multiplexed:

Subchannels of KGMB
Subchannel	Res.	Short name	Programming
5.1	1080i	KGMB	CBS
5.2	480i	Outlaw	Outlaw
5.3	480i	The365	365BLK
5.4	480i	Bounce	Bounce TV
5.5	480i	TruCrim	True Crime Network
9.1	1080i	KHII DT	MyNetworkTV (KHII-TV)

Broadcast on behalf of another station

=== Analog-to-digital conversion ===
KGMB ended regular programming on its analog signal, over VHF channel 9, on January 15, 2009, the date on which full-power television stations in Hawaii transitioned from analog to digital broadcasts (almost five months earlier than the June 12 transition date for stations on the U.S. mainland). The station's digital signal remained on its pre-transition UHF channel 23, using virtual channel 9. Following the channel swap with KFVE, the station's digital channel switched to UHF channel 23 and its virtual channel to 5.

At the same time, KGMD's digital signal relocated from its pre-transition VHF channel 8 to its former analog-era VHF channel 9, while KGMV's digital signal remained on its pre-transition UHF channel 24 (using its former analog channel 3 as its virtual channel) for post-transition digital operations.

== Satellite stations ==
As with other major television stations in Hawaii, KGMB operates multiple satellite stations and translators across the Hawaiian Islands to rebroadcast the station's programming outside of metropolitan Honolulu.

Station	City of license	Channels (RF / VC)	First air date	Call letters' meaning	ERP	HAAT	Facility ID	Transmitter coordinates	Transmitter location	Public license information
K20NX-D	Hilo	20 (UHF); 45	January 4, 1989		13.5 kW	151.1 m (496 ft)	34446	19°35′7″N 155°27′0″W		LMS
K28NN-D (Note: K28NN-D used the call sign K26CX from 1989 to 1991 and K27DW from 1991 to 2014.)	Wailuku	28 (UHF); 28	November 30, 1989		1.08 kW	11 m (36 ft)	34448	20°42′33″N 156°15′52″W		LMS
KSIX-DT3	Hilo	22.3 (UHF); 13.3	August 22, 1983	The station was previously on channel 6 under a different owner.	8 kW	−170 m (−558 ft)	34846	19°43′40″N 155°4′1″W	on top of Hilo Hawaiian Hotel	Public file LMS
KOGG-DT3	Wailuku	16.3 (UHF); 13.3	August 22, 1989	"OGG" is Kahului Airport's IATA code	50 kW	818 m (2,684 ft)	34859	20°39′25.5″N 156°21′35.8″W	summit of Haleakala	Public file LMS

=== Former satellites ===
KGMD and KGMV used to simulcast KGMB programming until the 2009 channel swap with KFVE (now KHII-TV). The station was also simulcast on translators K69BZ (channel 69) in Lihue, which had a transmitter northwest of Omao, and K57BI (channel 57) in Waimea, with its transmitter in Kalaheo. As of October 2015, however, K57BI and K69BZ's licenses were canceled by the FCC.
