= KSIX-TV =

TV station in Hilo, Hawaii

Satellite of KHNL and KGMB, Honolulu

- Hilo, Hawaii; United States
- Channels: Digital: 22 (UHF); Virtual: 13
- Branding: KHNL (13.1); K5 (13.2); KGMB (13.3); Hawaii News Now

Programming
- Affiliations: 13.1: NBC; 13.2: Independent; 13.3: CBS

Ownership
- Owner: Gray Media; (Gray Television Licensee, LLC)
- Sister stations: KHNL, KGMB

History
- First air date: August 22, 1983
- Former call signs: KOHA-TV (1982–1986); KHBC-TV (1986–April 2020); KFVE (April–November 2020)
- Former channel numbers: Analog: 2 (VHF, 1983–2008)
- Former affiliations: Independent (1983–1985, 1986–1988); Dark (1985–1986); Fox (1988–1996)
- Call sign meaning: Prior station that used this call sign broadcast on channel 6

Technical information
- Licensing authority: FCC
- Facility ID: 34846
- ERP: 8 kW
- HAAT: −170 m (−558 ft)
- Transmitter coordinates: 19°43′40″N 155°4′1″W

Links
- Public license information: Public file; LMS
- Website: 13.1, 13.3: www.hawaiinewsnow.com; 13.2: www.hawaiinewsnow.com/k5/

KSIX-TV (channel 13) is a television station licensed to Hilo, Hawaii, United States, serving the Big Island of Hawaiʻi as an affiliate of NBC and CBS. It is a full-time satellite of Honolulu-based KHNL (channel 13) and KGMB (channel 5) which are owned by Gray Media. KSIX-TV's transmitter is located atop the Hilo Hawaiian Hotel on Banyan Drive; its parent stations share studios on Waiakamilo Road in downtown Honolulu.

== History ==
=== KOHA-TV ===
On August 31, 1981, Oceanic Broadcasting Company applied for a construction permit to build a new TV station on channel 2 in Hilo. The application was approved on February 22, 1982. However, the Henry family—including former Honolulu and longtime Los Angeles anchorman Chuck Henry and his brother Terry—did not get the station up and running for 18 months, and the Buck family of Los Angeles took a major ownership stake. KOHA-TV finally hit Hilo screens on August 22, 1983. Channel 2 was an independent station, based at the Hilo Hawaiian Hotel. KOHA-TV brought the Big Island its first local TV newscast, airing at 6:30 each night. Some of its programming came from the major networks, particularly ABC; it carried Nightline and was the only Hawaii station to broadcast ABC's Monday Night Baseball.

Within six months of signing on air, however, KOHA-TV had discarded its local news programming; the last edition aired on February 10, 1984. The station cited financial difficulties for dropping the local newscast and cut back its total staff to three employees at the same time. Even though the station had expanded its broadcast day in August, KOHA-TV entered bankruptcy. In February 1985, channel 2 went dark; in December, the station was sold to Oklahoma accountant Marvin S. Chupack. Chupack's $142,000 offer beat out competing bids from James A. Chase and from the Kingdom Corporation of Hilo, which hoped to use the TV station as the cornerstone of a Christian planned community in Puna.

=== KHBC-TV ===
Upon acquiring KOHA-TV, Chupack announced his intention to change the call letters to KHBC-TV, which had previously been used on the first TV station in Hilo, which is now KGMD-TV. Channel 2 returned to air on April 14, 1986, airing syndicated fare. The first major local production on the new KHBC-TV was BingoMania, a local bingo show, which debuted on June 2. Channel 2 also produced coverage of election returns and specials on teen pregnancy and Christmas.

After having revived channel 2, Chupack sold KHBC-TV in 1987 to Clio Enterprises, owners of KKON and KOAS radio as well as the Clio Awards. KHBC-TV continued as an independent station, though it revamped its lineup with Filipino programming, a slate of original shows and a full local news service, including local news at 6 a.m., 5 and 10 p.m. and a morning show Good Morning Hawaii. By 1988, KHBC-TV's local programming output had reached 40 hours per week.

In March 1988, workers at the station filed a petition to unionize under the International Brotherhood of Electrical Workers (IBEW) with the National Labor Relations Board (NLRB). The IBEW then filed a complaint with the NLRB in May, saying that the recent layoffs of seven station employees were connected to the unionization drive and that owner Bill Evans had threatened to shutter KHBC-TV if workers voted to join a union; Evans said the layoffs were justified by the operating losses of channel 2, running into tens of thousands of dollars per month, and compared the unionization push to "socialism" and "Gestapoism". No winner was named in the May 17 vote because nearly half the ballots were challenged.

The continuing financial troubles of KHBC-TV, however, finally became too much for Evans. On June 30, 1988, he announced that channel 2 would cease operations that day, stating that he was losing $57,000 a month running the business. Evans agreed to a settlement with the NLRB in early August in order to prevent issues at his radio stations; IBEW supported the move, although the new owners were not expected to continue making programs. KHBC-TV was sold to the King Broadcasting Company, the Seattle-based owners of Honolulu's KHNL, which at the time did not have over-the-air coverage on the Big Island.

=== KFVE and KSIX-TV ===
On April 1, 2020, the station changed its call letters to KFVE. After Gray bought the Telemundo station on channel 6 at Kailua-Kona, it switched call letters with that station and became KSIX-TV on November 13.

== Subchannels ==
KFVE and KOGG, the other full-power KHNL satellite which was built in 1989, broadcast three subchannels. In 2009, upon Raycom Media entering into a shared services agreement that resulted in the original KGMB license becoming the new KFVE (now KHII-TV) and its repeaters being assigned to that station, the new KGMB CBS feed migrated from KGMD-TV to a subchannel of KHBC.

The station's signal is multiplexed:

Subchannels of KSIX-TV and KOGG
Subchannel	Res.	Short name	Programming
5.1	480i	Telemun	Telemundo
6.1	720p	K5	"K5" / KHNL-DT2 (Independent)
13.1	720p	KHNL-HD	NBC (KHNL)
13.3	720p	KGMB	CBS (KGMB)
