= Joe Moore (television journalist) =

American television personality

- Born: Joseph Brice Moore Jr.
- Occupation: Television personality
- Years active: 1969-present
- Known for: News anchor at KHON-TV
- Spouse: Teresa (m. 1991)
- Children: 1

Joseph Brice Moore Jr., known professionally as Joe Moore, is an American television personality. He is known mainly as the principal news anchor at KHON-TV in Honolulu, Hawaii; the state's Fox affiliate and highest-rated station. He is also a professional actor and playwright.

== Early life, military ==
Growing up in Honolulu, Moore attended Aiea High School for three years, but graduated from Beavercreek High School in Beavercreek, Ohio, where his father, a career United States Air Force officer, was stationed. He attended the University of Maryland, College Park where he majored in communication and history, but after two years of college, he enlisted in the United States Army. Moore served two tours of duty during the Vietnam War with the Army's 25th Infantry Division in Cu Chi, Vietnam, and the American Forces Vietnam Network in Saigon with close friend Pat Sajak.

== Journalism ==
Moore returned to Hawaii in 1969, joined KGMB as sports anchor under mentor and news director Bob Sevey. After nine years as part of the market-dominating news team at KGMB, Moore moved to KHON-TV which was then Hawaii's NBC affiliate (it joined Fox in 1995). Within a few years, KHON had passed KGMB as the top-rated station in Hawaii—a lead it continues to hold. In 2008, KHON-TV extended Moore's contract as lead news anchor for ten years.

== Dramatic arts ==
Moore has starred in two independent motion pictures, Goodbye Paradise (1991, featuring James Hong and Pat Morita), and Moonglow (2000, co-starring Milo O'Shea and Joanna Cassidy)

He has appeared in various episodes of network television series based in Hawaii, including Hawaii Five-O, Magnum P.I, Jake and the Fatman, One West Waikiki, and Tour of Duty.

Moore has also starred in live theatrical productions. He has co-starred numerous times with his longtime friend, television host Pat Sajak. The two have starred together in "Prescription: Murder," the original Columbo Mystery Thriller in 2025 at Hawaii Theatre, the Neil Simon play "The Sunshine Boys in 2023 at Hawaii Theatre, the Neil Simon play The Odd Couple in 2001 and 2012 (at the Connecticut Repertory Theatre), with Moore playing the slovenly Oscar Madison. They appeared together in a theatrical adaptation of The Honeymooners in 2004. They starred together in the Bernard Sabath play The Boys in Autumn in 2010 at the Hawaii Theatre in Honolulu. They co-starred in the dramatic comedy Wrestling Ernest Hemingway, based on the 1993 film, in 2014 at the Hawaii Theatre.

Moore wrote and starred in Prophecy and Honor (2007, co-starring Richard Dreyfuss and George Segal). In 2013 Moore co-starred with Patty Duke in "Heaven Forbid!", based on the BBC series Waiting for God at the Hawaii Theatre. In June 2015 he starred as James Wicker in the first post Broadway production of Terrence McNally's comedy, It's Only a Play, also starring Linda Purl and Cathy Foy, at the Hawaii Theatre.

Among the other produced plays that Moore has written and appeared in are Will Rogers Returns, The Buck Stops Where?, A Conversation with Mozart, John Wayne: The Man Behind the Legend, The Heydrich Covenant, The Best Show in America: Will Rogers on Politics, Dirty Laundry, Unlikely Lawman and Righteous Revenge.

== Personal life ==
Moore has been married to his wife Teresa, since 1991, and has one son, Bryce, who was born in 1998 and joined his father on the KHON staff as a journalist in 2021.
