= Tina Shelton =

Tina Shelton is an American television journalist and stage actress known for her work as a reporter and anchor in Hawaii, including at KHON-TV in Honolulu, Hawaii. She later worked in public relations at the John A. Burns School of Medicine.

== Career ==
=== Education ===
Shelton is a graduate of the University of Hawai'i journalism program (Kapiʻolani Community College and University of Hawaiʻi at Mānoa) and was recognized as an "Outstanding Young Alumna" in the University of Hawaiʻi Distinguished Alumni Awards in 1989.

=== News casting ===
Shelton began working in broadcast news at KHET in 1977. She subsequently worked at KHVH radio and Oceanic Cable Television. She worked at KGMB-TV from 1980 to 1985 and KITV from 1985 to 1999 before joining KHON-TV in 1999. Her reporting covered courts, local politics, and investigative stories. Her work has been nominated for regional Emmy awards, and she has won several local reporting awards.

=== Acting ===
Shelton is active in the Community Theater. She played Mrs. Anna Leonowens in the Rodgers and Hammerstein musical The King and I. She has also headlined in local productions of Guys and Dolls, Camelot and the musical Once Upon a Mattress with the Army Community Theater.

=== Public relations ===
In June 2007, the University of Hawaiʻi announced Shelton's appointment as director of public relations at the John A. Burns School of Medicine, effective the following month. Her responsibilities included internal and external communications, community outreach, and government relations. She served as the institution's Communications Director before retiring from the medical school in early 2020.

== Family ==
Shelton is married to Steve Beaudry. They were married on July 30, 1994, in Honolulu.
