= KIKU =

Television station in Honolulu

- Honolulu, Hawaii; United States
- Channels: Digital: 19 (UHF); Virtual: 20
- Branding: Hawaii's KIKU; KITV 4 Island News (newscasts)

Programming
- Affiliations: 20.1: Multicultural Independent; for others, see § Subchannels

Ownership
- Owner: Allen Media Group; (KIKU, LLC)
- Sister stations: KITV

History
- First air date: December 30, 1983
- Former call signs: KHAI-TV (1983–1993)
- Former channel numbers: Analog: 20 (UHF, 1983–2009)
- Former affiliations: ShopHQ (2021–2022); UPN (secondary, 2004–2006); FUNimation Channel (secondary, 2006–2007)
- Call sign meaning: "Kiku" is キク(菊), or Chrysanthemum in Japanese; former call letters of KHNL when it aired Japanese-language programming, 1967–1984

Technical information
- Licensing authority: FCC
- Facility ID: 34527
- ERP: 60.7 kW
- HAAT: 606.4 m (1,990 ft)
- Transmitter coordinates: 21°23′40″N 158°5′51″W

Links
- Public license information: Public file; LMS
- Website: www.kitv.com/kiku/

KIKU (channel 20) is an independent television station in Honolulu, Hawaii, United States, which primarily airs Japanese and Filipino programming. It is owned by Allen Media Group alongside ABC affiliate KITV (channel 4). The two stations share studios on South King Street in downtown Honolulu; KIKU's transmitter is located in Nānākuli.

Channel 20 in Honolulu went on air in December 1983 as KHAI-TV. Though built and originally owned by Tennessee-based Media Central, it has specialized in Asian programming for nearly its entire history. International Channel Network acquired KHAI-TV in 1989 as part of Media Central's bankruptcy. JN Productions took over operations in 1993 and changed the station's call sign to KIKU; its owner, Joanne Ninomiya, had been the general manager of channel 13 when that station was Japanese-language KIKU-TV. JN continued to supply Japanese-language programming for KIKU until 2004. UPN programming aired on channel 20 from 2004 to the network's closure in 2006. In addition, the station produced local programming, some of which was aimed at the Vietnamese and Filipino communities in Hawaii.

After passing through a number of owners including AsianMedia Group and NRJ TV, WRNN-TV Associates acquired the station in 2019. As part of a group affiliation agreement, KIKU converted to the home shopping network ShopHQ in June 2021, a switch met with outcry and dismay by Hawaii viewers. Allen Media Group acquired KIKU in 2022 and immediately restored its prior program format, augmented by English-language syndicated programs and local newscasts from KITV.

== KIKU on channel 13 ==
The call sign KIKU first was associated with Japanese-language television in Honolulu in 1967, when Richard Eaton bought KTRG-TV (channel 13) from David Watumull and renamed it KIKU-TV (kiku (キク(菊)) being the Japanese word for the chrysanthemum flower). His announced plans to make channel 13 a primarily Japanese-language station had led to scrutiny of the transaction by the Federal Communications Commission (FCC); during this time, the station's intended general manager programmed two hours a week of Japanese-language shows. By 1967, the station programmed entirely in Japanese.

In 1968, it began nightly telecasts of sumo wrestling. The station introduced English-language subtitles on its Japanese-language programs in 1970, which proved popular and expanded to having half of all programs subtitled by 1975. Another channel 13 specialty was children's programming; it aired such tokusatsu programs as Kamen Rider, Rainbowman, and Android Kikaider (known in Hawaii as Kikaida). The success of the latter was particularly noteworthy; the show beat Sesame Street in the ratings, and it was noted in an article in Time magazine. A station employee, Hideo Fujii, recalled that "older people in the Nikkei community would sit up straight in bed and weep" watching KIKU's programs.

In 1979, KIKU-TV was sold by Eaton to Mid-Pacific Television Associates. The new ownership proposed to reduce the proportion of Japanese-language programming at the station. This prompted general manager Joanne Ninomiya, who had run channel 13 since 1969, to depart in January 1981; she then started her own company, JN Productions, to broadcast Japanese-language shows on cable. The new KIKU-TV ownership instituted a mostly English-language program lineup in June 1981.

Under new general manager Rick Blangiardi, in 1984, KIKU-TV changed its call sign to KHNL. Ninomiya renewed her association with KHNL beginning in 1986, providing six hours of Japanese programs on Sundays as well as a daily newscast from Japan and subtitled sumo broadcasts.

== History ==
=== Construction ===
In late 1978, a group of investors known as Sunset Communications Corporation was formed to file for channel 20. Sunset shared investors with Delta Television, a subsidiary of advertising firm Petry Television that had put WPTY-TV in Memphis, Tennessee, on air earlier that year. For one of the principals, John A. Serrao, it was a return to Hawaii, as he had been general manager of KHVH-TV (channel 4) in the early 1960s when it was owned by Kaiser Broadcasting. The channel 20 construction permit was granted on August 12, 1980.

The group sold the permit to Media Central of Chattanooga, Tennessee, in 1982; under Media Central, the station began broadcasting as KHAI-TV on December 30, 1983, with Japanese-language programming from the Tokyo Broadcasting System. It was the fifth station Media Central built during 1983. In addition to Japanese-language programming, the station added Filipino programming in 1986 and shows in Korean in March 1989. However, its broadcast day was limited. In 1986, the station switched from signing on at noon to beginning at 4 p.m. because Oceanic Cable, the dominant cable provider on Oʻahu, placed it on the same channel as The Discovery Channel.

=== ICN/AsianMedia ownership ===
In 1987, Media Central filed for Chapter 11 bankruptcy. KHAI was sold for $1.75 million to International Channel Network (ICN), which owned Los Angeles multicultural station KSCI, in 1989. ICN moved the station to new studios on Sand Island Access Road in 1991, built a new transmitter, and expanded its weekly broadcasting by 28 hours; more than half of the new airtime featured programming in Chinese.

ICN brokered the station's airtime to JN Productions, the programming and subtitling company owned by Joanne Ninomiya, in 1993; JN began handling sales and programming duties. The first move made with the change in management was the consolidation of the cable programming from JN Productions as well as KHNL's Japanese-language shows onto channel 20's schedule. Ninomiya also changed the station's call sign to KIKU.

KSCI and KIKU were sold in 2000 to a consortium of The Korea Times and private equity firm Leonard Green & Partners, known as AsianMedia Group. In 2004, JN Productions ceased providing programming functions for the station, though it continued to supply KIKU with subtitles for its Japanese-language programming; the station brought programming operations in-house. In 2007, Japan's Ministry of Foreign Affairs honored Ninomiya with the Order of the Rising Sun, Gold and Silver Rays for contributing to "introducing Japanese culture and promoting friendship between Japan and the United States".

KIKU was the last of four stations to air UPN programming in Hawaii when it began airing the network's programs on November 1, 2004. UPN programs were usually broadcast in the late afternoon, leaving Japanese-language shows in prime time. The original UPN affiliate had been KFVE; when it dropped UPN to emphasize The WB, KHON-TV and KGMB then split UPN programming. KIKU was the only Honolulu station that could provide a two-hour block to air UPN prime time programming. When The WB and UPN merged to form The CW in 2006, KIKU passed on the offering because The CW wanted prime time clearance for its programming. In addition to shows it purchased, KIKU produced local programming. This included short-form segments such as The Wisdom of Hawai‘i's Elders, Japanese Word of the Day, and Itadakimasu. Its output also included a local show in Vietnamese and another in English aimed at the Filipino community. For a time, it aired anime syndicated by the Funimation Channel, making it the service's first non-cable affiliate; KIKU broadcast dubbed versions of select shows every weekday from 6 to 7 p.m. and 10 to 11 p.m.

KIKU discontinued analog broadcasting on January 15, 2009, the date on which full-power television stations in Hawaii transitioned from analog to digital broadcasts. The transition in Hawaii had been brought forward from the original February 17 national switch date—itself later delayed to June—because of concern that the dismantling of existing transmitter towers atop Haleakalā on Maui would affect the mating season of the endangered Hawaiian petrel, which begins in February. KIKU continued to broadcast on its pre-transition channel 19, using virtual channel 20.

In January 2012, AsianMedia Group filed for Chapter 11 bankruptcy protection; the station, along with KSCI in Los Angeles and its San Diego repeater KUAN-LP, was sold to NRJ TV (a company unrelated to European broadcaster NRJ Radio) for $45 million in March 2012, in a transaction that included the assumption of AsianMedia Group's debt.

=== Sale to WRNN-TV Associates; home shopping programming ===
Disappointment, disbelief, indignation. No more Red and White Song Festival at New Year's? No Abarenbo Shogun revivals or cute commercials for Gyotaku restaurants? In favor of another 24-hour shopping network?!

— Kathy Collins, opinion columnist for The Maui News, on her reaction to learning of KIKU's switch to ShopHQ

On December 9, 2019, WRNN-TV Associates announced it would purchase NRJ's TV stations; the acquisition received FCC approval in January 2020 and was completed the next month. WRNN-TV Associates continued the Asian format until announcing in May 2021 that it would affiliate all of the stations it owned with ShopHQ, a home shopping network, on June 28. For ShopHQ, this deal brought high-definition cable and satellite carriage on TV stations reaching more than 20 million homes in the major markets of New York, Los Angeles, Philadelphia, Dallas–Fort Worth, San Francisco, Houston, Washington, and Boston. The deal included KIKU; eight days later, the station announced that "The Rumor Is True" and that ShopHQ would displace all of KIKU's existing programming. It also meant the closure of the KIKU studio in the Pacific Guardian Center, in part because ShopHQ programming did not include local advertising.

The change led to considerable outcry, including among older viewers that had watched the station for decades and were not necessarily fluent in English. Station manager Phyllis Kihara told Pacific Business News, "We've been getting calls and emails and texts all day. When you look at Facebook, the messages people are leaving, we're really sorry we're going to lose this and I think that's what the people of Hawaii feel like, too." Kihara went as far as to provide aggrieved viewers her direct contact information. Observers, including Ninomiya, noted that running a Japanese-language TV station carried with it significant costs for licensing programs and additional expenses and needed personnel skills to translate and subtitle them. While a variety of sources for Japanese- and Filipino-language programming, such as Nippon Golden Network, continued to be available, these were all pay services to which viewers may not have necessarily been able to subscribe. In advance of the change in format, KIKU scheduled episodes in such a way as to complete series, airing some shows twice a week or more.

=== Sale to Allen Media Group ===
Only three months after the change to ShopHQ, on September 27, 2021, it was announced that KIKU would be sold to Allen Media Broadcasting, owner of KITV, for $4,000,000. The sale was completed on January 31, 2022.

Allen immediately moved to restore much of the prior programming and format to KIKU. On January 31, KIKU returned to airing Japanese and Filipino programming, as well as local newscasts from KITV. It also added Entertainment Studios and other syndicated content to fill the schedule out further. The general manager of KITV said that KIKU's new schedule would include about 75 percent of the programs the station had been airing prior to switching to ShopHQ, including some subtitled shows.

On June 1, 2025, amid financial woes and rising debt, Allen Media Group announced that it would explore "strategic options" for the company, such as a sale of its television stations (including KIKU and KITV). The Office of Hawaiian Affairs came forward as a potential bidder for KITV and KIKU in 2026, announcing a review process that was expected to take about 90 days.

== Subchannels ==
KIKU's transmitter is located in Nānākuli. The station's signal is multiplexed:

Subchannels of KIKU
Subchannel	Res.	Short name	Programming
20.1	720p	KIKU	Main KIKU programming
20.2	480i	MeToons	MeTV Toons (4:3)
20.3	480i	LAFF	Laff (4:3)
20.5	480i	JTV	Jewelry TV (4:3)
9.2	480i	Rewind	Rewind TV (KHII-TV)

Broadcast on behalf of another station

== See also ==
- Nippon Golden Network
- TV Japan
