= Morgan White (radio DJ) =

American DJ (1924–2010)

- Born: July 25, 1924; Monroe, Utah, U.S.
- Died: September 2, 2010 (aged 86); Sevier, Utah, U.S.
- Occupations: Radio DJ, actor
- Years active: 1967–1969, 1987

Morgan White (July 25, 1924 – September 2, 2010) was an American radio disc jockey and actor.

== Early life ==
White was born in Monroe, Utah, attended and graduated from Utah State University, was member of the Church of Jesus Christ of Latter-day Saints.

== Career and film information ==
From 1955 to 1965, White, using the stage name Pogo Poge, was a popular radio DJ at KIMN AM 950 in Denver, hosting the "Coca-Cola Hi-Fi Club" popular with teens and has been described in a 1984 Denver Post column as "Denver’s favorite disc jockey ever". There are conflicting reports about the stage name - whether he hopped a pogo stick from Denver to Boulder or in Utah, but he also embarked on various other more outrageous promotional stunts: sitting atop a flagpole at a used car lot for days, record for sitting on a Ferris Wheel, broadcasting from a snake pit in a Zale's Jewelers store window for two weeks. KIMN was admitted to the Colorado Music Hall of Fame in September 2012.

White left Denver for Hawaii and continued working as a DJ at radio station KGMB, also under the stage name Pogo Poge, becoming the #1 mid-day DJ. White is best known to a generation of Hawaii viewers as Pogo in the locally produced Checkers & Pogo show, which ran from 1967 to 1982 and was produced by KGMB/Honolulu. Jim Hawthorne played the first Checkers. Checkers & Pogo is considered the longest-running, most successful children's show in Hawaii. In addition to performing, White also wrote and produced several episodes of the daily show. He was the only original member of the series, outlasting the three actors who played Checkers during its run.

In addition to the Checkers & Pogo show, White had a minor role as the attorney general in six Hawaii Five-O episodes.

== Personal life and death ==
After the show ended, White retired to farm in Sevier, Utah. He died in Utah at the age of 86 on September 2, 2010.
