= Menor =

Menor is a surname. Notable people with the surname include:

- Benjamin Menor (1922–1986), an American jurist
- Barney B. Menor (1931–1999), an American politician, brother of Benjamin
- Ron Menor (1955–2023), an American politician, son of Benjamin
- Eva Menor (born 1972), a Catalan politician
- Melchor Menor (born 1974), an American kickboxer
- Ogie Menor (born 1986), a Filipino basketball player
- Goya Menor (born 1995), a Nigerian singer
- José Menor (born 2002), a Spanish footballer

== See also ==
- Menor's Ferry, a historic ferry in Wyoming named for a Menor homestead
