= Augie T. =

Hawaiian comedian and politician

Augusto E. Tulba (Augie T.)

Member of the Honolulu City Council from the 9th district
- Incumbent
- Assumed office January 2, 2021
- Preceded by: Ron Menor

Personal details
- Born: 1968 (age 57–58) Honolulu, Hawaii
- Party: Nonpartisan politician
- Website: www.vote4augie.com

Augie T. (born Augusto Emery Tulba in 1968) is an American politician, entertainer, comedian, and member of the Honolulu City Council since 2021. Tulba is a radio personality on KPHI, branded as Shaka 96.7, based in Honolulu, Hawaii. He was also a successful radio personality on KDNN and on KQMQ-FM. He started his career in comedy in the 1990s, but came to prominence in the 2000s. He was influenced by Rap Reiplinger. Augie also does voice-over work for local radio and television advertisements. In March 2019, he held what he announced would be his final public comedy show; he later resumed his comedy career in 2022.

== Personal life ==
Augusto Emery Tulba was born in 1968 and is the second oldest of six children. He grew up in the Kamehameha IV Housing Project (known to Hawaii residents as Kam IV Housing), in Kalihi Valley, a working-class area in urban Honolulu. He became a Golden Gloves champion boxer at age 16. He attended Farrington High School and graduated in 1986.

In 1991, Augie got his first taste of stand-up comedy, taking top honors during an open mic night at the Honolulu Comedy Club. Augie developed his earliest material with help from local comedian Andy Bumatai, who taught him that it is not always necessary to use profanity in order to get a laugh. The surviving members of Booga Booga (James Grant Benton and Ed Ka'ahea) also mentored him; Augie performed with them in 1993.

Augie won the Nā Hōkū Hanohano Award for Comedy Album of the Year with "Da Comedy Kahuna" in 1999. He won a second Hōkū Award in the comedy category with "Locally Disturbed" in 2003.

In 2002, Augie was voted Comedian of the Year by the Honolulu Star-Bulletin and MidWeek newspapers. He is the only local comedian to sell out the Blaisdell Arena ("Augie T. – The Blaisdell Arena Show") and is recognized as one of Hawai'i's Top 100 Influential Filipinos with an exhibit at the Bishop Museum. He was a recipient of Pacific Business News' "Forty Under 40" award. He also performed in Guam as part of the Guam Comedy Series in 2017.

On March 2, 2019, Augie held his final public comedy show with Andy Bumatai and Frank De Lima at the Blaisdell Arena, ending his nearly three-decade comedic career.

== Political career ==
In September 2019, he announced his interest in running for the Honolulu City Council. Augie filed nomination papers with the state Office of Elections on May 26, 2020, and was elected to represent District 9 of the Honolulu City Council on November 3, 2020.

== Blackface controversy ==
In June 2021, Augie reposted on Instagram a more than ten-year-old video in which he appeared in blackface in a skit titled "Hawaii's Next Top Mahu". Civil rights and LGBTQ activists criticized the video for its portrayal of African Americans and māhū, and the video was removed shortly thereafter.

=== Electoral history ===
2020 general election for Honolulu City Council District IX
Party	Candidate	Votes	%
Nonpartisan	Augusto E. Tulba (Augie T.)	21,265	49.2%
Nonpartisan	Will Espero	19,702	45.6%

== Film and television ==
Year	Title	Role	Director	Notes
2000	Baywatch	Himself	Anson Williams	Season 11, Episode 5: "Stone Cold"
2000	Baywatch	Himself	Anson Williams	Season 11, Episode 7: "Dream Girl"
2001	Baywatch	Himself	Gary Capo	Season 11, Episode 17: "Boiling Point"
2005	The Sand Island Drive-In Anthem (short)	Bobby	Ryan Kawamoto	
2007	Horsepower (short)	Harold	Joel Moffett	
2010	Hawaii Five-0	Kekipi	Alex Zakrzewski	Season 1, Episode 4: "Lanakila"
2011	Hawaii Five-0	Kekipi	Brad Turner	Season 1, Episode 13: "Ke Kinohi"
2011	Get a Job	Cousin Bully	Brian Kohne	
2012	Hang Loose	Himself	Ryan Kawamoto	
2013	Na Ali'i of Comedy: The Movie	Himself	Gerard Elmore	
2016	A Midsummer's Hawaiian Dream	Puka	Harry Cason	
2017	Maui	Detective Tulba	Brian Kohne	
2018	Magnum P.I.	Benny Kahana	Sylvain White	Season 1, Episode 3: "The Woman Who Never Died"
2020	Aloha Surf Hotel	Tai Alonzo	Stefan C. Schaefer	Post-production
