= Shayna Fox =

American child actress

- Fox at a party in 2005
- Born: Los Angeles, California, U.S.
- Occupation: Actress
- Years active: 1995–2006

Shayna Fox is an American former actress, known for voicing Regina "Reggie" Rocket on the Nickelodeon animated television series Rocket Power as well as Savannah on All Grown Up!.

== Early life ==
Fox is the second of two daughters born in Los Angeles, California to Jewish American parents Herschel Fox and Judy Spitzer.

== Career ==
Fox began her acting career in 1995, she made her feature film debut as the voice of Amy the Mountain Gorilla in the science fiction film Congo. Her other film credits include Can't Be Heaven as Shirley and co-written, co-produced and co-directed the short film The 10 Minute Run where she also played as the Girl.

Fox also co-starred in Disney Channel's That's So Raven as Tracie and had a supporting role in The Amanda Show.

She also worked as a voice actress in various animated television series and video games, she became the voice of Bela in The Oz Kids which ran for only 26 episodes. In 1999, she was cast as the voice of Regina "Reggie" Rocket in Nickelodeon's animated television series Rocket Power, which ran for five years until 2004, she has reprised the role in the television films Rocket Power: Race Across New Zealand, Rocket Power: Island of the Menehune and in the video games Nicktoons Nick Tunes, Rocket Power: Team Rocket Rescue, Rocket Power: Beach Bandits and Nickelodeon Party Blast. Her other voice credits include Savannah Shane in All Grown Up! and Angelica and Susie's Pre-School Daze.

== Filmography ==
=== Film ===
| Year | Title | Role | Notes |
|---|---|---|---|
| 1995 | Congo | Amy the Mountain Gorilla | Voice |
| 1999 | Can't Be Heaven | Shirley | |
| 2001 | The 10 Minute Run!!! | Girl | Also co-written, co-produced, co-directed and cinematographer |
| 2001 | Film Night 2001 | Unknown role | Video short Also producer, director, editor and cinematographer |
| 2001 | On Growing Older | Unknown role | Short |
| 2002 | Salvation | Angela | Short film |
| 2002 | No Prom for Cindy | Tracy | Short film |

=== Television ===
| Year | Title | Role | Notes |
|---|---|---|---|
| 1993 | South of Sunset | Katie Kincaid | Episode: "Custody" |
| 1996–97 | The Oz Kids | Bela (voice) | 26 episodes |
| 1998 | Oh Yeah! Cartoons | Kate Moon (voice) | 1 episode |
| 1999–2004 | Rocket Power | Regina "Reggie" Rocket, Little Girl, Danielle (voices) | 71 episodes |
| 2000 | The Amanda Show | Unknown role | Episode: "Mammal-O's" |
| 2002 | Rocket Power: Race Across New Zealand | Regina "Reggie" Rocket (voice) | Television film |
| 2003 | That's So Raven | Tracie | Episode: "The Parties" |
| 2004–07 | All Grown Up! | Savannah Shane (voice) | 3 episodes |
| 2005 | Angelica and Susie's Pre-School Daze | Savannah Shane (voice) | 4 episodes |

=== Video games ===
| Year | Title | Role | Notes |
|---|---|---|---|
| 1995 | Congo the Movie: Descent Into Zinj | Amy the Mountain Gorilla | |
| 2001 | Nicktoons Nick Tunes | Regina "Reggie" Rocket | |
| 2001 | Rocket Power: Team Rocket Rescue | Regina "Reggie" Rocket | |
| 2002 | Rocket Power: Beach Bandits | Regina "Reggie" Rocket | |
| 2002 | Nickelodeon Party Blast | Regina "Reggie" Rocket | |
