= Gary LeRoi Gray =

American actor

- Born: February 12, 1987 (age 39); Chicago, Illinois, U.S.
- Other name: Gary Gray
- Occupation: Actor
- Years active: 1991–present

Gary LeRoi Gray (born February 12, 1987) is an American actor who has appeared in movies, television and animation.

== Early life ==
Gary LeRoi Gray was born on February 12, 1987, in Chicago, Illinois.

== Career ==
He is best known for his childhood role as Nelson Tibideaux, the son of Sondra Huxtable Tibideaux and Elvin Tibideaux on the NBC sitcom The Cosby Show. He appeared on the series during its eighth and final season (1991–1992). He is also known for his role as Nelson Minkler in the Disney Channel sitcom Even Stevens, and as the voice of A.J. in The Fairly OddParents (replacing Ibrahim Haneef Muhammad in that role in 2003).

Gray's other voice roles include Charley on Clifford the Big Red Dog, Sam "The Squid" Dullard on Rocket Power and Mitch in Whatever Happened to Robot Jones?. Recurring live-action roles have included Nelson Tibideaux on The Cosby Show, Nelson Minkler on Even Stevens, and Bobby the Inquisitive Boy on The Weird Al Show.

== Filmography ==
Year	Title	Role	Notes
1997	Crayola Kids Adventures: Tales of Gulliver's Travels	Bob/Bogo	Direct-to-Video
1998	Slappy and the Stinkers	Domino	
2001	Betaville	Kirby (young)	
2001	Focus	Marcus	
2004	Salvation	Langston Hughes	Short
2006	Bring It On: All or Nothing	Tyson	
2008	Noah's Arc: Jumping the Broom	Brandon	
2014	Blackbird	Efrem	
2015	Retrospect	Jamal	Short
2016	Vigilante Diaries	Bass	
2021	Batman: The Long Halloween	Pearce (voice)	Direct-to-video

=== Television ===
Year	Title	Role	Notes
1991–1992	The Cosby Show	Nelson Tibideaux	7 episodes
1992	The Fresh Prince of Bel-Air	Young Carlton	1 episode
1993–1994	Living Single	Kevon	2 episodes
1993–1995	Family Matters	Little G	3 episodes
1995–1996	Guideposts Junction	Himself	TV Episodes
1996	ER	Mummy Boy	1 episode
1996	High Incident	Joey	1 episode
1997	The Weird Al Show	Bobby the Inquisitive Boy	7 episodes
1998–2001	7th Heaven	Clarence Fields	2 episodes
1998	The Tiger Woods Story	Tiger Woods (age 9-13)	Television film
1999	Party of Five	Michael	1 episode
2000–2002	Rocket Power	Sam "Squid" Dullard (voice)	Main cast (Season 2–3)
2000–2003	Clifford the Big Red Dog	Charley (voice)	Supporting role
2001–2002	Even Stevens	Nelson Minkler	Recurring role
2001	Samurai Jack	A Kid / Pig #2 (voices)	1 episode
2002–2017	The Fairly OddParents	A.J. / others (voice)	Supporting role
2002–2003	Whatever Happened to... Robot Jones?	Mitch (voice)	Main cast
2002	Rocket Power: Race Across New Zealand	Sam "Squid" Dullard (voice)	Television film
2003	Abra-Catastrophe!	A.J. (voice)	Television film
2004	The Jimmy Timmy Power Hour	A.J. (voice)	Television film
2004	The Fairly OddParents in Channel Chasers	A.J. (voice)	Television film
2004	The Fairly OddParents in Fairy Idol	A.J. (voice)	Television film
2004	Fillmore!	Nick Baker (voice)	1 episode
2005	School's Out!: The Musical	A.J. (voice)	Television film
2006	The Jimmy Timmy Power Hour 2: When Nerds Collide	A.J. (voice)	Television film
2006	The Jimmy Timmy Power Hour 3: The Jerkinators!	A.J. (voice)	Television film
2008	House	Chorus #4	1 episode
2009	Wishology	A.J. (voice)	Television film
2011	CSI: Miami	Perry Carmichael	1 episode
2014	Taylor'd Problems	Kev	1 episode
2024	The Fairly OddParents: A New Wish	A.J. (voice)	1 episode

=== Video games ===
Year	Title	Role	Notes
2000	Clifford the Big Red Dog: Learning Activities	Charley	
2002	Rocket Power: Beach Bandits	Sam "Squid" Dullard (voice)	
2003	The Fairly OddParents: Breakin' da Rules	A.J.	
2016	Fallout 4: Far Harbor	Dr. Teddy Wright, Brother Kane, Dejen	
