= Ray Bumatai =

American actor

- Born: Raimund Bumatai; December 20, 1952; Offenbach am Main, West Germany
- Died: October 6, 2005 (aged 52); Honolulu, Hawaii, U.S.
- Occupations: Actor; musician; singer; recording artist
- Years active: 1986–2005
- Spouse: Karen Brilliande (m. 1993)
- Children: 1
- Relatives: Andy Bumatai (brother)

Raimund Bumatai (December 20, 1952 – October 6, 2005) was an American actor, musician, singer and recording artist, who worked in comedy and live entertainment in Waikiki and in live-action production and animation in Hollywood.

== Early life ==
Bumatai was born on December 20, 1952. He was the older brother of stand-up comedian Andy Bumatai.

== Career ==
He had been active in motion pictures and television since the late 1980s. A supporting actor in many television series filmed in Hawaii, Bumatai often played a local character. In Sherwood Hu's Hawaiian Ghost thriller Lani Loa (1998) he played the character Hawaiian Kenny. Among his more recent work, Bumatai read the part of Tito Makani Jr. on Klasky Csupo's Rocket Power animated series.

== Personal life ==
Bumatai and his wife Karen "Bree" Bumatai, were married in 1993. Together they have a daughter, Cecilly Ann.

== Death ==
Bumatai died in Honolulu on October 6, 2005, at the age of 52, after having been treated for brain cancer at various times during the last years of his life. His last role was the voice of Little Jim in the Scooby-Doo film Aloha, Scooby-Doo!.

== Filmography ==
=== Film ===
Year	Title	Role	Notes
1991	Goodbye Paradise	Eddie	
1994	Tis the Season	Kimo	
1995	Under the Hula Moon	King	
1998	Lani Loa – The Passage	Hawaiian Kenny	
2001	Ho'olawe: Give and Take	Cliff Ahia	
2005	Pele O Ka Foodmart	Lieutenant	
2005	Aloha, Scooby-Doo!	Little Jim (voice)	
2006	Sunday Wind	Keoni	Short film Released posthumously

=== Television ===
Year	Title	Role	Notes
1995	One West Waikiki	Detective Kepui	Episode: "Unhappily Ever After"
1998	Martial Law	Car Jacker	Episode: "How Sammo Got His Groove Back"
1999–2004	Rocket Power	Tito Makani, Various (voice)	59 episodes
2000	The Wild Thornberrys	Geogi (voice)	Episode: "Song for Eliza"; Credited as Ray H. Bumatai
2002	Rocket Power: Race Across New Zealand	Tito Makani (voice)	Television movie
2004	Hawaii	Kimo	Episodes: "Cops n' Robbers" and "Out of Time"

=== Video games ===
Year	Title	Role	Notes
2002	Rocket Power: Beach Bandits	Tito Makani (voice)	Credited as Ray H. Bumatai
