= Ron Menor =

American politician (1955–2023)

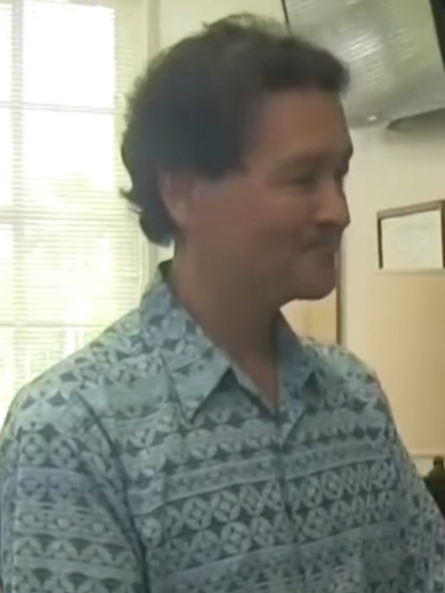
- Menor in 2017

Member of the Honolulu City Council, District IX
- In office 2013–2021
- Preceded by: Nestor Garcia
- Succeeded by: Augie Tulba

Member of the Hawaii Senate from the 18th district
- In office May 2000 – November 4, 2008
- Appointed by: Ben Cayetano
- Preceded by: Randy Iwase
- Succeeded by: Michelle Kidani

Member of the Hawaii House of Representatives
- In office 39th district (1982-1984); 12th district (1984–1986); 39th district (1992-2000)
- Succeeded by: Charlotte Nekota

Personal details
- Born: September 29, 1955 Hilo, Hawaii, U.S.
- Died: January 17, 2023 (aged 67)
- Party: Democratic
- Education: University of California, Los Angeles (BA); Georgetown University Law Center (JD)

Ronnie Christopher (Ron) Menor (September 29, 1955 – January 17, 2023) was a prominent Filipino-American politician and attorney in Hawaiʻi. He is one of the few individuals in the state's history to have served in the Hawaiʻi House of Representatives, the Hawaiʻi State Senate, and the Honolulu City Council. Throughout his four-decade career, he was known for his advocacy for consumer protection, public education, and the Filipino community.

== Early life and education ==
Menor was born in Hilo, Hawaiʻi, and was the son of Benjamin Menor, the first Filipino-American to serve as a justice on the Hawaiʻi Supreme Court. He was also the nephew of former Representative Barney B. Menor. He attended Iolani School in Honolulu.

Menor graduated from the University of California, Los Angeles (UCLA) with a degree in Political Science before earning his Juris Doctor from the Georgetown University Law Center. After law school, he returned to Hawaiʻi to serve as a law clerk for Chief Justice William S. Richardson.

== Political career ==
=== Hawaiʻi State Legislature ===
Menor was first elected to the Hawaiʻi House of Representatives in 1982 at the age of 27. Over the next 26 years, he served multiple non-consecutive terms in both the House and Senate, representing Mililani and Central Oʻahu. During his time in the State Senate, he chaired the Committee on Commerce, Consumer Protection, and Housing, as well as the Committee on Energy and Environment. He was a primary architect of the state's landmark "Gas Cap" law and was a staunch defender of the Hawaiian Homes Commission Act.

In the 2008 primary election, several months after he pleaded no contest to driving drunk with his 11-year-old son in the car, Menor lost the Democratic renomination to Michelle Kidani.

=== Honolulu City Council ===
In 2012, Menor was elected to the Honolulu City Council, representing District 9 (Waipahu, Village Park, Mililani Mauka). He served as Council Chair and oversaw major infrastructure developments, including the Honolulu Rail Transit project, which he championed as a vital transportation link for working families. He left the Council in 2021 due to term limits.

In 2022, Menor ran for the Honolulu City Council District 8 seat but narrowly lost in the general election to Val Okimoto.

== Death and legacy ==
Menor died unexpectedly on January 17, 2023, at the age of 67, following a medical emergency. Governor Josh Green ordered flags across the state to be flown at half-staff in his honor, praising Menor as a "fearless" and "dedicated public servant."
