= Leesa Clark Stone =

Leesa Clark Stone is a television journalist and former news anchor. She originally worked for Honolulu, HI-based TV station KITV during the 1980s as a news reporter and anchor. Clark was also the reporter for KITV's "Working 4 You" franchise. She later moved to Atlanta, GA in 1990. There, she anchored newscasts on CNN Headline News from 1990 to 1991 for a period of 18 months. She then moved to Nashville, TN to work for WTVF, a CBS affiliate station.

Stone was married to Hawaii-based comedian Rap Reiplinger until his death in 1984.

In May 2019, Leesa wrote the book "Paradise to Paradise: The Rap Reiplinger Story" about the life of the popular Hawaiian comedian.

She is now married to Rich, owner of Stone Productions, LLC, and is living in Nashville. They are parents to two boys.
