= Raven (American TV series) =

- Jeffrey Meek as Jonathon Raven
- Genre: Drama; Martial arts; Secret society
- Created by: Frank Lupo
- Starring: Jeffrey Meek; Lee Majors; Andy Bumatai
- Country of origin: United States
- Original language: English
- No. of seasons: 2
- No. of episodes: 20 (1 unaired)

Production
- Running time: 46–47 minutes (without commercials)
- Production company: Columbia Pictures Television

Original release
- Network: CBS
- Release: June 19, 1992 – April 30, 1993

Raven is an American martial arts drama series that originally aired on CBS from June 19, 1992 to April 30, 1993. The series was created by executive producer Frank Lupo and a production of Columbia Pictures Television for CBS.

== Overview ==
Jonathon Raven is a ninja-trained former Special Forces agent, retired in Hawaii to search for his long-lost son. Avoiding assassins sent to kill him by his former associates in the Black Dragon Clan, he uses his skills to help those in need. He is assisted by his former military buddy turned eccentric private investigator, Herman "Ski" Jablonski.

== Plot ==
When Jonathon Raven was twelve years old, his parents were killed by the Black Dragon. He trained with them for many years in the deadly martial arts with the hopes of mastering their lethal skill and then using it against them for vengeance. Although he succeeded in infiltrating them and killing a number of them when he returned to exact his vengeance, the Black Dragon are many in number and not all were present when this took place. When those not present later returned to find their numbers slain by Raven, they vowed to destroy Raven's bloodline. His one true love, a beautiful Japanese woman named Aki, becomes pregnant with their son at the same time the Black Dragon clan is after Raven's life. Aki dies shortly after giving birth to their son, but before she dies, she realizes that her son's life is in danger. Jonathon learns of his wife's plan of hiding their son from imperilment, but never gets to see him or attain the knowledge of his location. Later on, he joins the U.S. Special Forces and becomes one of their top assassins under a man named Nick Henderson. After many complications and regrets, Raven leaves the Special Forces and continues his search for his long-lost son. His search eventually leads him to Honolulu, Hawaii, where he believes his son may be. Raven is on a lifelong journey in search of his son, and is willing to risk his life along the way to find him and ensure the safety of his life, with the aid of his old military buddy – a private investigator named Herman "Ski" Jablonski.

== Cast ==
- Jeffrey Meek as Jonathon Raven
- Lee Majors as Herman "Ski" Jablonski
- Andy Bumatai as The Big Kahuna

== Episodes ==
=== Original pilot ===
1. Raven: Return of the Black Dragons – 90 minutes (without commercials)

=== Season 1: 1992 ===
No. overall	No. in season	Title	Directed by	Written by	Original release date
1	1	"Return of the Black Dragon"	Craig R. Baxley	Frank Lupo	June 24, 1992
2	2	"The Unseen Enemy"	James Contner	Frank Lupo	July 1, 1992
3	3	"Reunion"	Vern Gillum	Bill Nuss	July 8, 1992
4	4	"...And Everything Nice"	Kristoffer Siegel-Tabori	Lawrence Hertzog	July 22, 1992
5	5	"Is Someone Crazy in Here or Is It Just Me?"	James Darren	Lawrence Hertzog	July 29, 1992
6	6	"Prey"	James Darren	Lawrence Hertzog	September 26, 1992
7	7	"The Death of Sheila"	Jim Johnston	Bill Nuss	October 3, 1992

=== Season 2: 1993 ===
No. overall	No. in season	Title	Directed by	Written by	Original release date
8	1	"Bloody Beach"	James Darren	Steven L. Sears	January 2, 1993
9	2	"Playback"	David Hemmings	Lawrence Hertzog	January 9, 1993
10	3	"The Journey"	Guy Magar	David H. Balkan	January 16, 1993
11	4	"Heat"	David Hemmings	Lawrence Hertzog	January 23, 1993
12	5	"Rip-Off"	Ron Garcia	Lawrence Hertzog	January 30, 1993
13	6	"Death Games"	James Darren	Frank Lupo	March 6, 1993
14	7	"Disciples of Dawn"	Lee Katzin	David H. Balkan	March 13, 1993
15	8	"Something in the Closet"	Michael Levine	Lawrence Hertzog	March 20, 1993
16	9	"Checkmate"	Vern Gillum	Steven L. Sears	March 27, 1993
17	10	"Wipe-Out"	Les Sheldon	Steven L. Sears	April 3, 1993
18	11	"The Guardians of the Night"	David Hemmings	Lawrence Hertzog	April 10, 1993
19	12	"Poisoned Harvest"	Guy Magar	David H. Balkan	April 17, 1993
20	13	"Flori and Dori"	David Hemmings	Lawrence Hertzog	unaired

== Home media ==
The complete series as originally broadcast on CBS (including the abbreviated 70 minute pilot) was released as a manufacture-on-demand DVD by Sony Pictures Home Entertainment on April 5, 2016.

Mill Creek Entertainment announced the re-releasing of the series on DVD.
