= List of Rocket Power episodes =

Rocket Power is an American animated television series created by Arlene Klasky and Gábor Csupó for Nickelodeon. Debuting on August 16, 1999, the series ran and concluded on July 30, 2004 with a total of seventy-one episodes over the course of four seasons.

== Series overview ==
Season	Segments	Episodes	Originally released	
Season	Segments	Episodes	First released	Last released
Pilot			Unaired	
1	40	20	August 16, 1999	March 21, 2000
2	40	20	March 28, 2000	March 22, 2004
3	40	20	September 10, 2001	March 25, 2004
4	12	11	July 19, 2003	July 30, 2004

== Episodes ==
=== Pilot (1998) ===
Title	Directed by	Written by	Original release date
"Rocket Beach"	Steve Loter	Vic Wilson & Eryk Casemiro	Unaired
Rocket Beach is the pilot episode that was used to sell the show. It was produced in 1998, but never aired.

=== Season 1 (1999–2000) ===
No. overall	No. in season	Title (Note: Alternate titles sourced from iTunes, Nickelodeon, and YTV episode guides.)	Directed by	Written by	Original release date	Prod. code	Viewers (millions)
1a	1a	"New Squid on the Block"	Dave Fontana	Michael Bloom & Andy McElfresh	August 16, 1999	001A	N/A
Sam has to learn to find his place in the Rocket gang when he moves to Ocean Shores from Kansas after his mother gets divorced.
1b	1b	"Down the Drain"	Steve Ressel & Jim Duffy	Story by : Victor Wilson; Teleplay by : Michael Bloom & Andy McElfresh	August 16, 1999	001B	N/A
When the Stimpletons are ready to briefly leave town, Reggie is entrusted to look after and maintain their pool while they are away. The boys decide to drain the pool and use it as a skateboarding bowl, but everything backfires when the drained pool water floods the Rockets' basement and the gang must fix the problem before Raymundo and the Stimpletons find out.
2a	2a	"Secret Spot"	Steve Ressel & Jim Duffy	Story by : Michael Bloom & Andy McElfresh; Teleplay by : David Regal	August 18, 1999	002A	N/A
When Ocean Shores is flooded with shoobies, Raymundo permits Otto and Reggie to take Twister and Sam to his secret Surf Spot, unaware that Lars and his gang want to use it themselves.
2b	2b	"Ice Queens"	Dave Fontana	David Regal & Adam Beechen	August 18, 1999	002B	N/A
Twister's girly-girl cousin, Clio, goes along with the gang to Winterfest for their respective ice competitions, but both she and Reggie are at each other's throats about which competition is better.
3a	3a	"Otto 3000"	Jim Duffy	David Regal	August 23, 1999	003A	N/A
When Otto's snowboard gets mangled just before a competition, a smooth-talking, two-faced Sno-Mart representative offers him a corporate sponsorship and persuades Otto to become a sell-out.
3b	3b	"Night Prowlers"	Jeff Scott	Emily Kapnek	August 23, 1999	003B	N/A
After being challenged by Lars, Otto and the gang agree to sneak out of their homes at midnight to meet him for a street hockey game. Meanwhile, Merv seeks out a night prowler and plans a stakeout.
4a	4a	"Happy Luau to You-Au"	Jeff Scott	Adam Beechen	August 25, 1999	004A	N/A
Reggie's birthday plans become ruined when Otto accidentally gets the gang suspended from Madtown, so Violet tries to cheer her up by offering to throw Reggie a birthday party.
4b	4b	"Rocket Rescue"	Andrei Svislotski	Story by : David Regal; Teleplay by : Adam Beechen, Michael Bloom & Andy McElfresh	August 25, 1999	004B	N/A
Twister and Sam learn how to be lifeguards when both their mothers sign them up for the Ocean Shores Junior Lifeguard Program.
5a	5a	"Twister's Cuz"	Jim Duffy	David Regal	August 30, 1999	005A	N/A
Twister has to watch his six-year-old cousin, Scotty, while waiting to ride on the new attraction at the amusement park on the pier.
5b	5b	"Big Thursday"	Rick Bugental	Story by : Michael Bloom & Andy McElfresh; Teleplay by : David Regal & Adam Beechen	August 30, 1999	005B	N/A
When Otto's surfing idol, "The Rhino," comes to town to surf a mighty wave during a tropical storm, Otto is determined to join him.
6a	6a	"Rocket Girls"	Steve Ressel & Jim Duffy	Story by : Kendra Mora; Teleplay by : David Regal	September 1, 1999	006A	N/A
After being denied Raymundo or Tito, Reggie decides to team up with Violet for the annual Family Fun Day Competition in hopes of winning the gang a brand-new wave bike.
6b	6b	"Father's Day Off"	Dave Fontana	Story by : Michael Bloom & Andy McElfresh; Teleplay by : Mindy Schneider & Adam Beechen	September 1, 1999	006B	N/A
When Sam's father comes to town, he decides to take Sam and the gang out for the day to Wishing Waters, Laser Crater and Sno-Mart. Sam, however, is upset and feels like he's being neglected by his father because he's too busy with work to join in on the fun.
7a	7a	"Powergirl Surfers"	Rick Bugental	Story by : Dalina Soto-Loeser; Teleplay by : David Rosenberg	September 8, 1999	007A	N/A
Reggie starts a movement to empower the local female surfers to be proud of what they can do after a representative from the Gnarly Surf Magazine said that girls can't surf and refuses to feature any girl surfers in their magazines.
7b	7b	"Twisted Cinema"	Jeff Scott	David Regal	September 8, 1999	007B	N/A
When Twister shows off a video of Otto performing tricks at the Shore Shack, it causes a snag in their friendship because the video publicly humiliates Otto by containing shots of him wiping out.
8a	8a	"Blader Bowl"	Jim Duffy	David Regal & Adam Beechen	September 20, 1999	008A	N/A
The Blader Bowl debuts at Madtown with a news crew capturing video of the gang in action. However, the shots of Otto mistakenly get edited together with the shots of Sam, so now everyone thinks Sam is a professional blader.
8b	8b	"Total Luger"	Dave Fontana	Story by : David Regal; Teleplay by : David Rosenberg	September 20, 1999	008B	N/A
When Otto notices that Street Luging is the latest craze, he and Twister become interested and decide to try it out for themselves. Otto cheats in the race, but the guilt soon gets to him.
9a	9a	"'D' is for Dad" "D is for Dad"	Rick Bugental	Michael Bloom & Andy McElfresh	September 13, 1999	009A	N/A
Just as Raymundo is about to take the gang away for a big surfing trip, Otto gets a bad grade in school and is not allowed to come and has to spend the weekend at the Stimpletons'.
9b	9b	"Banned on the Run"	Jeff Scott	David Rosenberg	September 13, 1999	009B	N/A
When Otto accidentally collides with Merv while skateboarding and causes him to sprain his arm, local activists use the incident as an excuse to ban skateboarding on the boardwalk and pier. However, the gang soon comes up with a brilliant plan to fight the ban and that plan eventually culminates in the grand opening of Madtown.
10a	10a	"Super McVarial 900" "Super Mcvarial 900"	Rick Bugental	Story by : Michael Bloom & Andy McElfresh; Teleplay by : Adam Beechen	September 15, 1999	010A	2.14 (HH) (Note: (HH) represents the number of households the episode was viewed in when it premiered.)
Otto gets a false sense of confidence for a competition when he successfully pulls off the Super McVarial 900, a new and difficult skateboarding move that Sam swears cannot be done.
10b	10b	"Loss of Squid"	Rick Bugental	Emily Kapnek	September 15, 1999	010B	2.14 (HH)
The gang's friendship with Sam gets tested when he ditches them and makes friends with a fellow computer genius named Oliver.
11a	11a	"Rainy Days & Sundaes"	Jeff Scott	Story by : David Rosenberg; Teleplay by : Adam Beechen	September 22, 1999	011A	N/A
When Otto, Reggie and Twister make a huge chocolate mess in the Rockets' kitchen, Reggie escapes to avoid taking blame so that she doesn't miss the chance to participate in her junior triathlon.
11b	11b	"Zine Dreams"	Rick Bugental	David Regal & Adam Beechen	September 22, 1999	011B	N/A
Tired of Otto and Twister's relentless teasing, Reggie decides to get even by writing an issue of the 'Zine containing embarrassing secrets about the boys so they will become the laughing stocks of the beach, however, it accidentally gets printed and distributed.
12a	12a	"Hawaii Blues"	Dave Fontana	David Regal	September 27, 1999	012A	N/A
Everyone takes Tito for granted until his strange behavior calls attention to the fact that he feels excluded and homesick for Hawaii.
12b	12b	"Lost and Find"	Jim Duffy	David Rosenberg	September 27, 1999	012B	N/A
When the gang discover that a tough five-year-old girl named Mackenzie has lost her parents, they decide to help her locate them.
13a	13a	"The Night Before"	Rick Bugental	Adam Beechen & Michael Rotman	October 25, 1999	013A	N/A
Otto, Twister and Sam all decide to take a chance and agree to sneak out with Eddie, Prince of the Netherworld for Mischief Night. However, when Reggie sees a news report that anyone caught engaging in Mischief Night pranks will spend a night in jail, she tries to get the boys to come home before they get caught by Raymundo and Officer Shirley for breaking curfew.
13b	13b	"Violet's Violet"	Jeff Scott	Story by : J.T. Fenn; Teleplay by : David Rosenberg	October 25, 1999	013B	N/A
The Rocket gang think nothing of accidentally destroying Violet's flower garden with their homemade wooden soapbox car, until Merv explains that they've ruined her chances of taking First Prize at the yearly Oceanfest, so Otto, Reggie, Twister and Sam decide to try and win Violet the downhill soapbox race trophy at Oceanfest to make up for it.
14a	14a	"Fall & Rise of Sam"	Jim Duffy	Michael Bloom, Andy McElfresh & David Regal	October 20, 1999	014A	2.17 (HH)
Otto and Twister look down on bodyboarding and because of that, Sam feels left out and that he doesn't belong in the group, so Reggie and Tito decide to help him out by teaching Sam how to surf all on his own.
14b	14b	"Typhoid Sam"	David Fontana	Story by : J.T. Fenn; Teleplay by : David Rosenberg	October 20, 1999	014B	2.17 (HH)
When Sam comes down with the Fiji Flu, it quickly spreads to Otto, Reggie and Twister, who are too sick to play in the big street hockey game, so Sam tries to come up with a team to keep them in the play-offs.
15a	15a	"The Wrath of Don"	Rick Bugental	J.T. Fenn; Teleplay by : David Rosenberg	March 7, 2000	015A	N/A
Otto's favorite action movie star and skateboarding idol, Donnie Lightning, is coming into town to shoot his latest upcoming film. However, Otto soon becomes disillusioned when he realizes that Donnie cannot really skate and is nothing like he is in the movies.
15b	15b	"Safety Patrol Sam"	Jeff Scott	Adam Beechen, Michael Bloom & Andy McElfresh	March 7, 2000	015B	N/A
When Sam is forced into being on the Safety Patrol at school, he takes it too far and becomes abusive in his new position of power.
16a	16a	"Reggie and a Net" "Reggie & A Net"	David Fontana	David Regal & Michael Rotman	March 7, 2000	016A	N/A
When the local beach volleyball team is holding try-outs for new players, Reggie decides to go for it and does whatever it takes to make the team so that she can join up with Trish and Sherry.
16b	16b	"The Great Sandcastle Race" "Great Sandcastle Race"	Jim Duffy	J.T. Fenn	March 7, 2000	016B	N/A
Sam rises to Oliver's challenge that nobody can beat him and his genius team in the annual Ocean Shores Sandcastle Competition.
17a	17a	"Escape From Lars Mountain"	Jeff Scott	Michael Rotman & David Regal; Teleplay by : David Regal	March 14, 2000	017A	3.38 2.21 (HH)
After Lars gets caught picking on Twister, he is forced to be nicer to him, so he invites Twister on a biking trip to Mondo Mountain. Twister brings the rest of the gang along with him and when Lars and his gang trick them again while they're all up there, Twister decides to pull off a devious trick on Lars.
17b	17b	"It Was a Dark and Stormy Day"	David Fontana	Michael Bloom, Andy McElfresh & J.T. Fenn	March 14, 2000	017B	3.38 2.21 (HH)
During a bad thunderstorm, Sam overhears commotion coming from the Shore Shack and believes Tito was murdering Raymundo, when in fact Ray and Tito were planning to surprise the gang with a lobster boil.
18a	18a	"The Aloha Kid" "Aloha Kid"	Bob Fuentes	Adam Beechen & David Rosenberg	March 14, 2000	018A	2.20 (HH)
Tito's young nephew, Keoni, is coming into town from Hawaii for a few days to participate in an invitational surf contest. When he shows up however, Otto becomes jealous because Keoni is getting all of the attention by doing everything much better than him.
18b	18b	"Otto Mobile" "Ottomobile"	Jim Duffy	Story by : Victor Wilson; Teleplay by : Scott Gray, Michael Bloom & Andy McElfresh	March 14, 2000	018B	2.20 (HH)
Tito gets sick and can't work, so Raymundo requests Otto and Reggie to help him out at the Shore Shack, which occurs the same day as the skateboarding competition at Madtown. Reggie and Sam agree to cover for Otto so that he can take part in the competition, but things start to get crazy when Sam gets locked in the freezer and Reggie has to contend with rude customers.
19a	19a	"Big Air Dare" "The Big Air Dare"	Rick Bugental	Peter Egan	March 21, 2000	019A	3.14
Otto and Reggie start a fierce battle of one-upmanship to determine who is the better snowboarder. Twister and Sam can't decide, as both of them seem equally great, so Otto and Reggie decide to go on "The Big Air," which is for experienced adult boarders only. However, because Otto chose to ignore the warnings from the ski patrol officer to stay off the slope, he ends up breaking his leg.
19b	19b	"Otto's Big Break"	Jeff Scott	Story by : David Regal; Teleplay by : David Rosenberg	March 21, 2000	019B	3.14
Otto gets restless after being cooped up in the house with a broken leg following the snowboarding accident in the previous episode. Determined to play in the big street hockey tournament while Reggie, Twister and Sam look for a replacement player until Otto heals, he futilely tries to compensate for his cast with ridiculous contraptions.
20a	20a	"Snow Day"	Rick Bugental	David Rosenberg	March 21, 2000	020A	3.10
When Sam tells everyone about how school was cancelled every time it snowed back when he was living in Kansas, it gives Otto the idea to play hooky and drags Sam along with him so they can have the day off from school while an assembly looms. While Twister and Reggie are having fun during the assembly when it turns out to be a surprise carnival day, Otto and Sam get busted when they get stuck on a roller coaster.
20b	20b	"Welcome to the Club"	Dave Fontana	Story by : Michael Bloom & Andy McElfresh; Teleplay by : David Regal	March 21, 2000	020B	3.10
When Otto gets a free trial membership to the Ocean Shores Beach Club, the gang get intrigued and decide to go and check it out despite Raymundo's warnings that the club has way too many rules.

=== Season 2 (2000–01; 2004) ===
No. overall	No. in season	Title	Directed by	Written by	Original release date	Prod. code	Viewers (millions)
21a	1a	"All About Sam"	Jeff Scott	Story by : Heather McDonald; Teleplay by : David Rosenberg	March 28, 2000	021A	2.17 (HH)
When a new kid named Josh shows up in Ocean Shores, he tries to buddy up with the gang, but is not exactly met with open arms. However, Josh soon finds a sympathetic friend in Sam who introduces him to Otto, Reggie and Twister and allow Josh to tag along.
21b	1b	"Half-Twister" "Half Twister"	Bob Fuentes	Story by : Peter Egan; Teleplay by : J.T. Fenn	March 28, 2000	021B	2.17 (HH)
Twister becomes scared to do any skateboarding after having a dangerous wipe-out and after an oblivious Otto rags on him for it.
22a	2a	"Twisting Away"	Dave Fontana	J.T. Fenn	March 28, 2000	022A	N/A
After Twister makes a gigantic mess in his backyard, he overhears his parents talking and believes that they are sending him away.
22b	2b	"The Spot Remover"	Rick Bugental	Michael Bloom, Andy McElfresh & J.T. Fenn	March 28, 2000	022B	N/A
Raymundo, Tito and the gang have the day off and decides to head out to their secret Surf Spot. However, the locals become upset with them and get themselves in trouble because they don't take care of the beach and disrespect the surf line.
23a	3a	"Rocket Repairs"	Louie del Carmen	David Rosenberg	November 3, 2000	023A	N/A
After Otto repairs a broken skateboard, the gang realizes they can make money by fixing sporting equipment and decide to start a little repair business. Business starts slowly but soon booms after Otto gets the word out, however, Otto has a scheme of his own.
23b	3b	"Say Hello to Cement Head"	Chris Hermans	Story by : J.T. Fenn; Teleplay by : David Regal	November 3, 2000	023B	N/A
When the gang sneak in on a newly-poured cement ramp being constructed at Madtown, Twister accidentally falls into the cement, leaving behind imprints of his face and hands. Upon discovering this, Conroy closes the park until he can find out who messed up the new vert ramp, warning patrons that the culprit, once identified, will be banned from ever skating at Madtown for life.
24a	4a	"Shark Bait"	Bob Fuentes	Story by : Gabriel Sullivan & Rob Forman; Teleplay by : David Regal	November 10, 2000	024A	N/A
When Ocean Shores becomes overrun with shoobies, Otto gets the idea to fake a shark sighting in order to try and clear the beach.
24b	4b	"A Shot in the Park"	Jeff Scott	Story by : J.T. Fenn; Teleplay by : David Rosenberg	November 10, 2000	024B	N/A
The Rocket gang head over to the Wet World marine animal park to make a video for their class project. While there, Twister sneaks into a closed exhibit and loses his camera in the process.
25a	5a	"Radical New Equipment"	Rick Bugental	Story by : David Rosenberg; Teleplay by : Michael Bloom & Andy McElfresh	December 4, 2000	025A	2.57 (HH)
When the Rocket gang run into a special class of disabled athletes on a snowboarding weekend, Reggie becomes intrigued by one of the girls who has a metal leg but can still snowboard on a competitive level.
25b	5b	"Tito's Lucky Shell"	Dave Fontana	Story by : Rob Forman; Teleplay by : David Rosenberg	December 4, 2000	025B	2.57 (HH)
When Sam finds an exotic shell on the beach, he and Reggie decide to take it back to the Shore Shack to show the rest of the gang.
26a	6a	"The Longest Day"	Jeff Scott	Michael Bloom & Andy McElfresh; Story by : Rob Forman	November 17, 2000	026A	N/A
The Rocket gang get challenged by Lars and his gang to an all-day competition over sea, air and land to see who can earn the right to claim their spot on the Wall of Fame inside the Shore Shack.
26b	6b	"Ottoman and the Sea"	Louie del Carmen	Michael Allen	November 17, 2000	026B	N/A
During a camping weekend, Otto, Reggie, Twister and Sam talk Raymundo into letting them go fishing all on their own in the boat.
27a	7a	"Mr. B is in The House"	Louie del Carmen	Story by : David Rosenberg & Rob Forman; Teleplay by : Rob Forman	January 5, 2001	027A	N/A
When the new school year begins in Ocean Shores, Otto and Twister prepare for the worst when they learn that they are getting a new homeroom teacher. However, Otto and Twister are surprised to find out that their new teacher for the year is actually Conroy.
27b	7b	"Earnest Otto"	Chris Hermans	Matt Karis	January 5, 2001	027B	N/A
After Otto breaks his third surfboard in a row, Raymundo tells Otto that he needs a lesson in responsibility and that he would not be able to get a new surfboard until he learns the value of hard work.
28a	8a	"The Good Housekeeping Seal"	Bob Fuentes	Rob Forman	March 30, 2001	028A	N/A
Twister befriends a wild harbor seal he names Bruce that follows him around town after feeding it and playing with it at the beach. Lieutenant Tice isn't having it though and makes Twister give up Bruce, so Twister must find a way to say so long to his new friend.
28b	8b	"What's That Smell?" "What's That Smell"	Dave Fontana	Michael Bloom & Andy McElfresh	March 30, 2001	028B	N/A
Otto volunteers the Rocket gang to clean up the garbage on the beach and in response they will get the beach named after them. However, when the same pieces of garbage already picked up keeps showing up every day, the gang realizes there is a bigger problem that they must solve first in order for them to finish the job permanently.
29a	9a	"Legends and Their Falls" "Legends & Their Falls"	Chris Hermans	David Rosenberg, Michael Bloom & Andy McElfresh	April 27, 2001	029A	1.22 (HH)
Ocean Shores is having its annual Fourth of July Legends and Family Surf-O-Rama Contest and Otto anxiously endeavors to win the first-place trophy so that he could become a surfing legend.
29b	9b	"Welcome to Ottoworld"	Jeff Scott	David Regal	January 27, 2001	029B	2.88 2.01 (HH)
When Otto, Reggie, Twister and Sam hear that there is going to be a time capsule buried in Ocean Shores, they each wonder about what the future of Ocean Shores will be like in five hundred years.
30a	10a	"Bruised Man's Curve"	Anthony Bell	David Rosenberg	April 6, 2001	030A	N/A
Otto enlist the aid of Reggie, Twister and Sam to support him with figuring out a plan to take a run down "Bruised Man's Curve," an extremely dangerous mountainboard track that doesn't get its name for nothing.
30b	10b	"Pool's Out Forever"	Rick Bugental & Jim Duffy	Story by : Sam Linsky & Andy Berman; Teleplay by : David Rosenberg	April 6, 2001	030B	N/A
When the Rocket gang confirms that Eddie, Prince of the Netherworld has gotten a brand-new empty pool, Otto sees it as a perfect skateboarding bowl and frantically wants to skate in the pool before it gets filled up.
31a	11a	"Back Bowl"	Dave Fontana	David Regal	April 13, 2001	031A	N/A
When the Rocket gang are up at Mount Baldy for a snowboarding weekend, Otto and Twister attempt to beat the crowds by taking a run down the off-limits backside of the mountain. Otto and Twister make Reggie and Sam promise not to tell Ray and Tito where they are, but when the two boys get lost while hiking back, Reggie and Sam eventually become worried and have no choice but to get help.
31b	11b	"Game Day"	Chris Hermans	Story by : David Regal; Teleplay by : Michael Bloom & Andy McElfresh	April 13, 2001	031B	N/A
The Rocket gang gets burnt out after practicing street hockey for hours and while Reggie, Twister and Sam are ready to give it up, Otto is still in a competitive mood, so he invents a new game called Rocketball and creates the rules for it as the game progresses.
32a	12a	"It Came From Planet Merv"	Rick Bugental & Jim Duffy	Michael Bloom & Andy McElfresh	January 19, 2001	032A	N/A
After Twister reads the comic book that Sam gave him about extraterrestrials invading a small town, it convinces him and Otto into thinking that Merv is a hostile space alien.
32b	12b	"Netherworld Night"	Louie del Carmen	Story by : David Regal; Teleplay by : Rob Forman	January 19, 2001	032B	N/A
When Eddie, Prince of the Netherworld invites the Rocket gang to come and stay over at his house for a spooky sleepover, Lars and his gang devise a scheme to scare them.
33a	13a	"Here's the Twist"	Bob Fuentes	David Rosenberg; Story by : J.T. Fenn	April 1, 2001	033A	2.35 (HH)
It's April Fools Day and the Rocket gang are trying to out-do each other with April Fools pranks. However, Twister's prank seems to be much more perplexing, so Otto, Reggie and Sam try to figure out what Twister is up to before the day is over.
33b	13b	"Sam: King of Kickball" "Sam, King of Kickball"	Bob Fuentes	David Rosenberg	April 1, 2001	033B	2.35 (HH)
At the school, Conroy becomes the Rocket gang's substitute gym teacher and introduces kickball to them as the sport of the week.
34a	14a	"Tito Time"	Jeff Scott	Story by : David Rosenberg; Teleplay by : Rob Forman	March 9, 2001	034A	1.87 (HH)
Wanting to spend some quality time with the Rocket gang, Raymundo and Tito agrees to a friendly wager that Tito cannot keep up with them and their activities for a whole week.
34b	14b	"The Return of Clio"	Rick Bugental & Jim Duffy	David Regal	March 9, 2001	034B	1.87 (HH)
When Twister's cousin Clio returns to Ocean Shores, she begins to grandly upstage Otto by doing all his moves better than he can.
35a	15a	"That Old Skateboard"	Chris Hermans	Story by : David Rosenberg & David Regal; Teleplay by : Michael Bloom & Andy McElfresh	April 20, 2001	035A	N/A
When Otto finds a dilapidated skateboard in the trash, Sam finds it rather interesting, so Otto decides to let Sam have it for himself. However, they didn't realize it was a special skateboard made back in the 1970s and after Sam refurbishes it, Otto becomes jealous.
35b	15b	"Follow the Leader"	Dave Fontana	Story by : Rob Forman & David Rosenberg; Teleplay by : Michael Bloom & Andy McElfresh	April 20, 2001	035B	N/A
After Otto and Twister get into a pretty heated argument over who was the one responsible for losing the street hockey game with Lars, Otto challenges Twister to take his position as team captain and lead the team to victory in the upcoming match against Lars.
36a	16a	"Channel Surfing"	Bob Fuentes	Story by : Gabriel Sullivan & David Regal; Teleplay by : Rob Forman	March 8, 2001	036A	N/A
When the surf is flat in Ocean Shores, Sam suggests that the gang can surf the waves made from the big boats in the ship channel.
36b	16b	"Outta My Pit!" "Outta My Pit"	Louie del Carmen	Story by : Rob Forman; Teleplay by : David Regal	March 8, 2001	036B	N/A
The Rocket gang acquire a ton of driftwood that's been washed ashore and decides to build their own personal driftwood cabana. However, when Lars and his gang want to own it for themselves, they compete against the Rocket gang to see who gets to keep it.
37a	17a	"Capture the Flag"	Jim Duffy	David Regal, Michael Bloom & Andy McElfresh	March 5, 2001	037A	2.08 (HH)
After a tie game of Capture the Flag at the school, the Rocket gang decide to utilize the entire Ocean Shores pier for their re-match.
37b	17b	"The Jinx"	Jeff Scott	David Rosenberg, Michael Bloom & Andy McElfresh	March 5, 2001	037B	2.08 (HH)
The Rocket gang get invited to go and surf the backside of Catalina Island, but Otto, Reggie and Twister are unsure whether or not they should bring Sam with them because they think Sam is a jinx.
38a	18a	"Hurricane Maurice"	Jim Duffy	Michael Bloom & Andy McElfresh	March 6, 2001	038A	1.93 (HH)
When a hurricane strikes Ocean Shores, Twister accidentally leaves his camera behind while he and the gang were out kiteboarding. After a few hours pass by, Otto and Twister naively venture out into the eye of the storm in order to search for Twister's missing camera, prompting a search and rescue mission from Lt. Ryan and their worried parents and friends.
38b	18b	"Reggie's Choice"	Dave Fontana	David Regal; Teleplay by : Rob Forman	March 6, 2001	038B	1.93 (HH)
Reggie finally joins the California All-State Girls' Beach Volleyball team as she's always wanted, but this means she now has to train for both this and her street hockey team, and the overexertion just might force Reggie to choose only one team to give her time to.
39a	19a	"Losers Weepers" "Loser's Weepers"	Chris Hermans	Story by : Rob Forman; Teleplay by : David Rosenberg	March 22, 2004	039A	N/A
The Rocket gang get hold of a motorized skateboard and agree to keep it hidden, however, it turns out to be too much fun to hide.
39b	19b	"Reggie: The Movie"	Louie del Carmen	Eric Kentoff	March 22, 2004	039B	N/A
When Trish and Sherry invite Reggie to check out a scary new movie, she is nervous about telling them that she's afraid to watch it.
40a	20a	"Double-O Twistervision"	Jim Duffy	Michael Bloom & Andy McElfresh	March 7, 2001	040A	N/A
Dissatisfied with the movie they just watched, the Rocket gang agree to film their own movie and then screen it at the Shore Shack.
40b	20b	"Womp Race 2000"	Bob Fuentes	Michael Bloom & Andy McElfresh	March 7, 2001	040B	N/A
When the steepest hill in town known as the California Incline gets repaved, the Rocket gang set up a risky downhill skateboarding race between Lars and his gang to see who gets the hill named after them.

=== Season 3 (2001–04) ===
No. overall	No. in season	Title	Directed by	Written by	Original release date	Prod. code	Viewers (millions)
41a	1a	"The Lingos"	Dave Fontana	Raphael Simon	April 8, 2002	041A	N/A
When all the shoobies in town suddenly start mimicking the Rocket gang's lingo, they decide to make up some original words and phrases in order to try and differentiate themselves from the crowd.
41b	1b	"Shack Attack"	Bob Fuentes	David Rosenberg	April 8, 2002	041B	N/A
Raymundo considers selling the Shore Shack away to the Happy Hut restaurant chain so that he could afford to move Otto, Reggie and himself into a more luxurious home and neighborhood.
42a	2a	"To Be Otto Not to Be" "To Be, Otto Not to Be"	Jeff Scott	Ryan Shankel	April 9, 2002	042A	N/A
After Otto meets and befriends a group of soul surfers, his loyalties to his friends and family get tested as Otto starts to ignore the gang and all of his responsibilities to the Shore Shack.
42b	2b	"Reggie/Regina" "Reggie / Reggina"	Chris Hermans	Erin Ehrlich	April 9, 2002	042B	N/A
Reggie begins to act very strange suddenly when she meets and hangs around with a handsome new classmate named Trent who recently moved into Ocean Shores from New Zealand.
43a	3a	"Reggie's Pen is Mightier"	Broni Likomanov	Michael Kramer	April 10, 2002	043A	N/A
For the anniversary issue of the 'Zine, Reggie wishes to write an article on the "Top Extreme Athlete" of Ocean Shores which gets all of the local kids to start competing for the esteemed title.
43b	3b	"Kayaks Amok"	Bob Fuentes	Mark Steen	April 10, 2002	043B	N/A
The Rocket gang finally gets invited to the annual Catalina Classic Paddleboard Race with Raymundo and Tito, but on the condition that they stay in their kayaks just behind the competitors.
44a	4a	"Tito Sitting" "Tito-Sitting"	Dave Fontana	Kati Rocky	April 11, 2002	044A	N/A
When Raymundo has to go out of town for the weekend, Tito volunteers to look after and take care of Otto and Reggie while he's absent.
44b	4b	"There's Something About Breezy"	Michael Daedalus Kenny	David Rosenberg	April 11, 2002	044B	N/A
Raymundo gets smitten with a beautiful woman named Breezy who also has a love for extreme sports and she starts bonding with Otto, Twister and Sam. Reggie, however, soon becomes jealous of Breezy because her athletic skills are getting all of the attention.
45a	5a	"Beach Boyz & a Girl"	Bob Fuentes	Raphael Simon	November 30, 2002	045A	N/A
Otto and Reggie inspire the gang to form their very own garage rock band when they discover and listen to an old vinyl record that Raymundo and Tito had made when they used to perform together in a surf rock band from their younger days.
45b	5b	"X-Treme Ideas"	Jeff Scott	Ryan Shankel	November 30, 2002	045B	N/A
The Extreme Sports Network is holding a contest and ask for video submissions on who can create the most original extreme sport which gets Otto and the gang to begin brainstorming and trying out their own unique ideas.
46a	6a	"Less Than Full Otto"	Broni Likomanov	Raphael Simon	June 1, 2002	046A	N/A
After Otto experiences a harsh wipe-out on the waves, he loses his self-confidence and becomes cautious because he is afraid that he will repeat the experience while surfing, skateboarding and blading.
46b	6b	"Card Sharked"	Chris Hermans	Ryan Shankel	June 1, 2002	046B	N/A
When Otto swindles Twister out of his favorite rookie card for a worthless piece of cardboard, Reggie and Sam start a rumor about the fake card in order to get back at Otto and teach him a lesson about ripping off his friends.
47a	7a	"Home Sweet Home"	Dave Fontana	David Rosenberg	February 18, 2002	047A	2.28 (HH)
An upscale indoor skate park chain known as Skatopia opens a location in Ocean Shores and threatens Conroy's business at Madtown. The gang pledges their loyalty to Madtown, but they find it impossible to resist when they get free passes to check out the place for themselves before its official opening day. However, when the park officially opens, they are let down because it turns out to not be as cool as they hoped it would be.
47b	7b	"What a Tangled Web We Ski"	Michael Daedalus Kenny	Ryan Shankel	February 18, 2002	047B	2.28 (HH)
Along the way to the ski resort, Raymundo exaggerates about how he was a freestyle skiing champion back in the 1970s. However, when a rowdy kid named Ralph bets Otto that his dad can beat him at freestyle skiing, Raymundo has to put his words into action.
48a	8a	"Enter the Hawk-Trix"	Jim Duffy	Roger Eschbacher	September 10, 2001	048A	N/A
After hearing that legendary skateboarder Tony Hawk has decided to retire from skateboarding, Otto and the gang track down and venture through his secret "Hawk's Nest," a multi-level private skate and snowboard obstacle course, to talk him into not giving up.
48b	8b	"Vert vs. Street"	Jeff Scott	Raphael Simon	September 10, 2001	048B	N/A
Conroy announces that Madtown will be having a skateboarding competition in both the "Vert" and "Street" divisions which causes Otto and Reggie to take sides and tries to convince each other about which one is better in both sports and in other things.
49a	9a	"Twister's Hat"	Chris Hermans	Ryan Shankel	February 18, 2002	049A	N/A
After losing his hat while riding the roller coaster on the pier, Twister has an identity crisis and reminisces with the gang about how he got it from his parents when he was little which prompts Otto, Reggie and Sam to scout around the pier and find Twister's hat for him.
49b	9b	"Tito-Thon"	Broni Likomanov	David Rosenberg	February 18, 2002	049B	N/A
Tito tries to get back in shape when his old Hawaiian surf buddies come into town to partake in the annual Ocean Shores Triathlon.
50a	10a	"Rad Rover Come Over"	Dave Fontana	Ryan Shankel	January 29, 2003	050A	N/A
When the gang come across a cool stray dog, Otto and Reggie agree to name him Ollie and brings him home. However, because of Raymundo's fear of dogs, Otto and Reggie enter Ollie in the local dog competition and try to win in hopes of convincing Raymundo to give him a chance.
50b	10b	"Extreme Nerd"	Bob Fuentes	David Rosenberg	January 29, 2003	050B	N/A
Sam enters in a remote control robot-fighting tournament and aims to beat Oliver and his crew who are the defending champions.
51a	11a	"Cinco de Twisto"	Michael Daedalus Kenny	Raphael Simon	May 3, 2003	051A	2.12 (HH)
When Twister's voice hits puberty just before having to sing for Cinco de Mayo, Lars fools him into believing he permanently ruined it.
51b	11b	"Saving Lt. Ryan"	Jeff Scott	Story by : David Rosenberg; Teleplay by : John Crane	May 3, 2003	051B	2.12 (HH)
Major Madison is flying out to inspect the beach and Lieutenant Tice thinks he is going to demand major discipline. When Madison arrives however, he enforces a "No Rules" policy which gives the Rocket gang and the shoobies free rein to do whatever they want.
52a	12a	"Summer Breezy"	Broni Likomanov	David Rosenberg	March 23, 2004	052A	N/A
Breezy invites Raymundo, Tito and the gang to join her at Lake Havasu to experiment with some state-of-the-art water sports gear.
52b	12b	"Sammy's Fortune"	Chris Hermans	John Crane	March 23, 2004	052B	N/A
The Rocket gang meet an odd fortune-teller named Patsy and she makes predictions about the gang that all seemingly come true. However, Sam begins to act foolishly when his fortune leads him to believe that he cannot be harmed and that he is indestructible.
53a	13a	"Major Scrummage"	Bob Fuentes	Raphael Simon	October 14, 2002	053A	N/A
When Trent is prepared to instruct the gang on how to play Rugby, Reggie gets offended because Trent assumes that the sport is much too rough for her.
53b	13b	"Snow Bounders"	Dave Fontana	Ryan Shankel	October 14, 2002	053B	N/A
When the news advises that the snowstorm known as El Nada is about to hit Ocean Shores, the Rocket gang have the time of their lives thanks to Sam who was able to show them plenty of cool activities to do in the snow he learned back when he lived in Kansas.
54a	14a	"Merv Links to Otto"	Jeff Scott	Roger Eschbacher	March 24, 2004	054A	N/A
Otto accidentally breaks the handlebar off his bike just before a competition and asks Merv if he could repair it for him. Merv agrees to fix the bike for Otto, but under the condition that Otto promises Merv a favor by becoming his golf caddy the following morning.
54b	14b	"Big Air"	Michael Daedalus Kenny	David Rosenberg	March 24, 2004	054B	N/A
After Sam has a severe asthma attack that lands him in the hospital, Otto, Reggie and Twister become concerned for his safety and decide to start treating Sam with much more caution by taking everything easy on him to make sure that he doesn't get sick again.
55a	15a	"Missile Crisis"	Chris Hermans	Raphael Simon	March 25, 2004	055A	N/A
Reggie meets her role model, professional mountain biker Missy "The Missile" Giove. However, while attempting to act like her idol, Reggie starts becoming rude and aggressive towards her friends and family after the gang taunted Reggie about her being boring.
55b	15b	"Falsely Alarmed"	Broni Likomanov	Ryan Shankel	March 25, 2004	055B	N/A
Lars gets severely punished for pulling the fire alarm at the Shore Shack after no actual fire was detected. However, it was Otto and Twister who were responsible for pulling the alarm because they wanted to use it to rush Reggie and Sam over to the Shore Shack.
56a	16a	"Twisting Places"	Dave Fontana	Raphael Simon	April 12, 2002	056A	N/A
Mrs. Rodriguez warns Lars that unless he stops bullying his younger brother, he will not be able to participate in the NHL Break-Out Tournament. Because of this, Twister seizes the opportunity to get some payback on Lars by provoking him with no fear of reprisal.
56b	16b	"Power Play"	Jeff Scott	Mark Steen	April 12, 2002	056B	N/A
The Rocket gang make it to the finals of the NHL Break-Out Tournament and has to win a fast-paced game of street hockey against the dominant Ocean Bluffs team so that they can earn the right to play an exhibition game with actual professional hockey players.
57a	17a	"Sim Sammy"	Michael Daedalus Kenny	Ryan Shankel	May 11, 2002	057A	2.20 (HH)
Sam creates an online computer game about Otto, Reggie and Twister and wants to keep it a secret from them, but when they find out about it and play the game for themselves, they become upset with Sam because his game is making fun of their personalities.
57b	17b	"Otto Hangs 11"	Bob Fuentes & Michael Mullen	David Rosenberg	May 11, 2002	057B	2.20 (HH)
Otto celebrates his eleventh birthday and thinks that he might be old enough to become a professional athlete. With his newfound resolution to not waste any more time, he becomes obsessed with trying to perfect his athletic abilities to fulfill his undying dream.
58	18	"Race Across New Zealand"	Broni Likomanov, Jeff Scott & Carol Millican	John Crane	February 16, 2002	058–060	5.05 3.07 (HH)
59	19	"Race Across New Zealand"	Broni Likomanov, Jeff Scott & Carol Millican	John Crane	February 16, 2002	058–060	5.05 3.07 (HH)
60	20	"Race Across New Zealand"	Broni Likomanov, Jeff Scott & Carol Millican	John Crane	February 16, 2002	058–060	5.05 3.07 (HH)
After working long and hard by making food deliveries all over Ocean Shores for the Shore Shack, Otto, Reggie, Twister and Sam at last earn enough money to cover the entry fee so their team can compete in the annual New Zealand Junior Waikikamukau Games.

=== Season 4 (2003–04) ===
No. overall	No. in season	Title	Directed by	Written by	Original release date	Prod. code	Viewers (millions)
61	1	"Twist of Fate"	Dean Criswell	Story by : Stephanie Clayton; Teleplay by : Matthew Bakal & Alain de Leonardis	March 26, 2004	061	N/A
When Otto and the gang go off the bike trail and get lost while exploring the Grand Canyon, Twister is highly confident that he can rescue them because he watches "Gung-Ho Gopher," an educational cartoon show with good advice on how to survive in the wild.
62	2	"A Rocket X-Mas"	Anthony Bell	Story by : Charles Esten; Teleplay by : Heather Sheffield	December 15, 2003 (Note: This episode was first released in the Nicktoons Christmas DVD on September 30, 2003.)	062	N/A
Otto and Reggie receive an important Christmas lesson after spending too much time trying to make money by walking and taking care of the neighborhood dogs so they can afford to buy an expensive classic surfboard for Raymundo as a surprise Christmas gift.
63	3	"Reggie's Big (Beach) Break" "Reggie's Big Break"	Jeff Scott & Dean Criswell	John Crane & Erin Ehrlich	July 19, 2003	063–065	1.93 (Note: with kids aged 2-11)
64	4	"Reggie's Big (Beach) Break" "Reggie's Big Break"	Jeff Scott & Dean Criswell	John Crane & Erin Ehrlich	July 19, 2003	063–065	1.93
65	5	"Reggie's Big (Beach) Break" "Reggie's Big Break"	Jeff Scott & Dean Criswell	John Crane & Erin Ehrlich	July 19, 2003	063–065	1.93
Otto, Reggie, Twister and Sam are enthusiastic to have their hometown playing host to a seven-day beach-break television special featuring extreme sports, celebrity skateboarder appearances and a concert performed by a pink-haired pop artist named Shaffika.
66a	6a	"New Girl on the Block"	Andrei Svislotski	Stephanie Clayton	June 16, 2004	066A	N/A
While skateboarding at Madtown, Reggie makes friends with a mysterious new girl named Carla. However, because of Carla's weird and secretive behavior, the gang becomes suspicious so they agree to follow Carla home in an attempt to find out more about her.
66b	6b	"After Shocked"	Michael Daedalus Kenny	Story by : Victor Wilson; Teleplay by : Ryan Shankel	June 16, 2004	066B	N/A
After a massive earthquake hits Ocean Shores, Otto and Twister see an amazing opportunity and decides to take advantage of the situation by capturing footage of themselves skateboarding around the evacuated town despite major possibilities of aftershocks.
67	7	"Island of the Menehune"	Michael Daedalus Kenny, Andrei Svislotski & Ron Noble	Erin Ehrlich	July 16, 2004	067–069	4.20 (Note: Rating with kids aged 9-14)
68	8	"Island of the Menehune"	Michael Daedalus Kenny, Andrei Svislotski & Ron Noble	Erin Ehrlich	July 16, 2004	067–069	4.20
69	9	"Island of the Menehune"	Michael Daedalus Kenny, Andrei Svislotski & Ron Noble	Erin Ehrlich	July 16, 2004	067–069	4.20
After working hard all summer at the Shore Shack, Raymundo and Tito agree to reward the Rocket gang's efforts by taking them all to Hawaii for a big summer vacation where Raymundo becomes smitten and re-kindles an old romance with Tito's cousin, Noelani.
70	10	"The Big Day"	Ron Noble & John Holmquist	Story by : Erin Ehrlich & Ryan Shankel; Teleplay by : Erin Ehrlich & Victor Wilson	July 30, 2004	070–071	N/A
71	11	"The Big Day"	Ron Noble & John Holmquist	Story by : Erin Ehrlich & Ryan Shankel; Teleplay by : Erin Ehrlich & Victor Wilson	July 30, 2004	070–071	N/A
Raymundo and Noelani's wedding is just weeks away and Otto and Reggie have to assist them with the ceremony plans. However, when the date clashes with the grand opening of the Zero Gravity Zone indoor skate park, Otto seeks to change the wedding date.
