= Nestor Garcia (politician) =

American politician (born 1957)

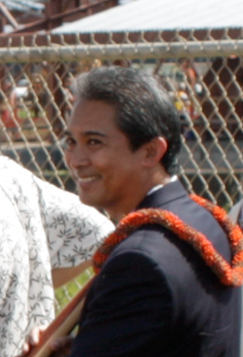
- Garcia in 2011

Member of the Honolulu City Council, District IX
- In office 2003–2013
- Preceded by: John DeSoto
- Succeeded by: Ron Menor

Member of the Hawaii House of Representatives from the 37th district
- In office 1994–2002
- Preceded by: Julie Duldulao
- Succeeded by: Redistricted

Personal details
- Born: February 13, 1957 (age 69) Honolulu, Territory of Hawaii
- Party: Democratic

Nestor R. Garcia (born February 13, 1957) is a Filipino-American politician and former journalist from Hawaiʻi. He served as a member of the Honolulu City Council and the Hawaiʻi House of Representatives, representing areas including Waipahu and Mililani. As of 2026, he serves as the Communications Director for U.S. Representative Ed Case.

== Early life and education ==
Garcia was born in Honolulu and raised in the community of Waipahu. He graduated from Waipahu High School in 1975 before attending the University of Hawaiʻi at Mānoa, where he earned a Bachelor of Arts in Journalism in 1980.

== Career ==
Before entering public office, Garcia was a well-known television news reporter for KHON-TV (Channel 2) in Honolulu. He spent a decade reporting on the state legislature and local politics, a background that influenced his transition into elective office in the 1990s.

=== Hawaiʻi House of Representatives (1994–2002) ===
Garcia was first elected to the Hawaiʻi House of Representatives as a Democrat in 1994. During his eight-year tenure, he represented District 37 (Waipahu) and was involved in legislative efforts surrounding economic development and community infrastructure.

=== Honolulu City Council (2003–2013) ===
In 2002, Garcia was elected to the Honolulu City Council, representing District 9 (Kunia, Mililani, and Waipahu). He served two full terms, including a period as the Council Chair. His work on the Council often centered on transportation and land use, specifically the development of the Honolulu Rail Transit project.

In 2012 and in 2015, Garcia was fined thousands of dollars by the Honolulu Ethics Commission to settle allegations that he accepted illegal gifts and failed to report them, and failing to disclose conflicts of interest during his time as a council member. He subsequently resigned as a KHON-TV news reporter.

=== 2006 Congressional Campaign ===
In 2006, Garcia ran in the Democratic primary for Hawaiʻi's 2nd congressional district. He competed in a crowded field of candidates for the seat vacated by Ed Case, but was ultimately unsuccessful.

=== Later Career ===
Following his service on the City Council, Garcia returned to the private and public communication sectors. He served as the Press Secretary for U.S. Senator Daniel K. Inouye and worked in executive roles for City Bank. Since January 2019, he has served as the Communications Director for Congressman Ed Case in his Honolulu and Washington, D.C. offices.

== Personal life ==
Garcia is married to Karen Mun Garcia. He has remained active in community organizations, serving on boards for the National Kidney Foundation of Hawaii, the Leeward YMCA, and the Filipino Chamber of Commerce.
