= Andy Bumatai =

American comedian and actor

- Born: Andrew Jackson Bumatai; December 24, 1953 (age 72); Germany
- Occupations: Actor; stand-up comedian; television host; producer
- Relatives: Ray Bumatai (older brother)
- Website: www.andybumatai.com

Andrew Jackson Bumatai (born December 24, 1953) is an American actor, stand-up comedian, television host and producer from Hawaii. He is of Native Hawaiian, Filipino, French and German ancestry.

== Early life ==
Bumatai was born in Germany to a German mother and an American military father. He lived in San Francisco for much of his childhood and moved to the Kalihi neighborhood of Honolulu on the island of Oahu, Hawaii, at the age of 13. After a year in Kalihi, he and family then moved to the Waianae neighborhood. His brother was actor Ray Bumatai, who died on October 2, 2005.

Bumatai would drop out of Waianae High School in 11th grade and work different jobs, eventually leading to an early career as a salesman in his early 20s. He would then decide to venture into stand-up comedy as a result of few being in Hawaii. Though initially struggled finding work as venues generally preferred musical entertainers over comedic ones, he eventually was hired and started opening for comedian Frank De Lima. Bumatai would then replace the late Rap Reiplinger in Booga Booga and continue to perform stand-up comedy.

== Career ==
Bumatai recorded a number of comedy albums. His first won a Nā Hōkū Hanohano Awards award for "Most Promising Artist" and he went on to win three more for "Best Comedy Performance." He has also created a number of TV specials for Hawaii's KGMB-TV, notably High School Daze and All in the Ohana. He and his brother, Ray Bumatai also created BumaVision for Hawaii's OC16 network. Outside of Hawaii, he has been featured on the TV series Raven, and has had roles on shows like North Shore and Baywatch. Bumatai also co-starred in a 1997 pilot for an unaired Hawaii Five-O series.

Bumatai was executive producer of Nighttime Productions, and produces and starred in his own Hawaii-based online talk show, The Andy Bumatai Show. He was also the host of Toolin' Around, a series on motorbikes, and The Daily Pidgin, a show that talks about the Hawaiian Pidgin language and local Hawaii customs. During the COVID-19 pandemic, Bumatai streamed regularly, in different time slots, on YouTube, Twitch and several other platforms. Currently, he streams with co-host James Mane and editorialized news from Hawaii featuring music videos.

== Works credited, stage appearances, and filmography ==
Years active	Title	Role	Notes
1980	School Daze Comedy Special		
1981	All in the Ohana Comedy Special		
1990–1995	Opened for Tom Jones, Kenny Loggins, Natalie Cole, Lionel Richie, Paul Anka, Kool & the Gang, Charlie Daniels	Stand-up comedy / Opener	
1990–1995	Punchline (San Francisco, CA), Comedy & Magic Club (Hermosa Beach, CA), Rooster T. Feathers (Sunnyvale, CA), The Ice House (Pasadena, CA), The Comedy Store, Main Room (La Jolla, CA), Various others	Headliner	
1992–1993	Raven, Season 12		
1993	Whoopi Goldberg's Comedy Tonight		
1994	Rosie O'Donnell's Comedy Show		
1994–1995	Marker, Season 13		
1995	Pat Morita's Triple Crown of Comedy (Showtime Special)		
2006–2008	NightTime with Andy Bumatai	Host	
2012–2014	In the Car	Host	
2014–2016	Toolin' Around	Host	Hawai'i TV
2015–present	Toolin' Around	Producer, Host	YouTube
2016–present	The Daily Pidgin	Producer, Host	YouTube
