= Lani Loa – The Passage =

Lani Loa - The Passage
- Italian DVD release poster (MEDUSA)
- Directed by: Sherwood Hu
- Written by: John P. Marsh
- Produced by: John P. Marsh; Sherwood Hu
- Starring: Angus Macfadyen; Ray Bumatai; Carlotta Chang; Chris Tashima
- Cinematography: Hou Yong
- Edited by: Nicholas C. Smith
- Music by: Frank Fitzpatrick
- Production company: Chrome Dragon Films
- Release date: September 25, 1998
- Running time: 89 minutes
- Countries: United States; China
- Language: English

Lani Loa – The Passage is a 1998 action crime film directed by Sherwood Hu, and executive produced by Francis Ford Coppola, about a woman murdered on her wedding day in Hawaii who comes back to haunt her murderers. The film stars Angus Macfadyen, Ray Bumatai, Carlotta Chang and Chris Tashima. It was the first film from Coppola's and Wayne Wang's Chrome Dragon Films, a short-lived film company that was to specialize in utilizing Asian talent on American-financed projects. Set in Hawaii, the film was shot in Hilo, Hawaii and in China, in Hainan and Shanghai.

It screened at the San Sebastian Film Festival and the Hawaii International Film Festival (as Lani Loa: The Heavenly Passage) and has been released in Asia on VCD, as Lani-Loa (Hawaiian Ghost Story).

== Cast ==
(Main players)

- Angus Macfadyen as Turner
- Ray Bumatai as Hawaiian Kenny
- Carlotta Chang as Jenny
- Chris Tashima as Bong
- Leonelle Akana as Auntie Wana

== See also ==
- List of ghost films
