= Rocket Power =

American animated sports television series

- Main promotional logo
- Genre: Sports; Adventure
- Created by: Arlene Klasky; Gábor Csupó
- Developed by: Victor Wilson; Eryk Casemiro; Michael Bloom; Andy McElfresh
- Voices of: Joseph Ashton; Shayna Fox; Ulysses Cuadra; Gilbert Leal; Sam Saletta; Gary LeRoi Gray; Sean Marquette; John Kassir; Ray Bumatai
- Theme music composer: Mark Mothersbaugh
- Opening theme: "Rocket Power Theme" by The Wipeouters
- Ending theme: "Rocket Power Theme" (Instrumental)
- Composer: David Eccles
- Country of origin: United States
- Original language: English
- No. of seasons: 4
- No. of episodes: 71 (132 segments) (list of episodes)

Production
- Executive producers: Gábor Csupó; Arlene Klasky; Eryk Casemiro
- Producers: Susan Ward; Pernelle Hayes; Victor Wilson; John Crane; Maureen Iser; Erin Ehrlich
- Running time: 24 minutes
- Production company: Klasky Csupo

Original release
- Network: Nickelodeon
- Release: August 16, 1999 – July 30, 2004

Rocket Power is an American animated television series created and produced by Klasky Csupo for Nickelodeon. It aired on Nickelodeon from August 16, 1999 to July 30, 2004. The show centers on the daily lives of Otto, Reggie, Twister and Sam, four pre-adolescent children with an interest in extreme sports such as skateboarding and surfing while also getting into various situations.

== Premise ==
Rocket Power revolves around the day-to-day zany hijinks and adventures of a gang of four young and fiercely loyal friends; the adventurous and vain sports enthusiast and perfectionist: Otto Rocket; his tomboyish and kind-hearted older sister: Regina "Reggie" Rocket; Otto's dim-witted but loyal best friend and videographer: Maurice "Twister" Rodriguez; and the brainy techno whiz kid and relative newcomer: Sam "Squid" Dullard — who live in the fictional Southern California beach community of Ocean Shores where they spend their free time playing varied extreme sports (such as skateboarding, surfing, snowboarding, biking, street hockey, etc.) and getting into various situations while overcoming the many trials and challenges of growing up.

Otto and Reggie live with their widowed strict but loving father and veteran surfer, Ray "Raymundo" Rocket, who along with his best friend and business partner, Tito Makani, owns and operates the Shore Shack, a combination burger joint and surf rental shop where the gang usually hang out. In most episodes, they get involved in competitions, but end up learning their friendship is more important than winning.

== Characters ==
=== Main characters ===
From left to right: Otto, Reggie, Sam, Twister.

- Otto Rocket (voiced by Joseph Ashton): A 10-year-old extreme-sports enthusiast. Otto is the skilled, audacious and charismatic leader of the gang whose relentless pursuit of athletic perfection may make him somewhat unreliable.
- Regina "Reggie" Rocket (voiced by Shayna Fox): Otto's 11-year-old sister. Reggie is a strong and intelligent crusader for the underdog and the publisher of The 'Zine, a magazine that covers a wide range of topics from extreme sports to politics.
- Maurice "Twister" Rodríguez (voiced by Ulysses Cuadra in seasons 1–3 and Gilbert Leal in season 4): Otto's Hispanic best friend. Twister is an aspiring filmmaker who rarely leaves home without his video camera. Although his older brother Lars can be Otto's biggest competitor, Twister consistently remains very loyal to Otto.
- Sam "Squid" Dullard (voiced by Sam Saletta in season 1, Gary LeRoi Gray in seasons 2–3 and Sean Marquette in season 4): Sam is an intelligent, inquisitive and loyal technological prodigy from Hutchinson, Kansas. He is much more cautious than the rest of the gang, which helps keeps them much more grounded.
- Ray "Raymundo" Rocket (voiced by John Kassir): Raymundo is Otto and Reggie's widowed strict but loving forty-something father, legendary surfer and is the owner and operator of a combination burger joint and surf rental shop called the Shore Shack. He drives a 1962 Mercury Woodie wagon and has developed a fear of dogs after watching the movie Attack of the 50 Ft. Poodles when he was just a kid.
- Tito Makani (voiced by Ray Bumatai): Tito is a retired Hawaiian surfer and self-designed philosopher who not only works side by side with Raymundo to help him run the Shore Shack, but he also provides the gang with helpful advice and valuable life lessons with his own unique brand of wisdom. He usually starts his advice with "Like the ancient Hawaiians say ..." Tito has a young nephew named Keoni who occasionally visits Ocean Shores from the Hawaiian Islands to see him.

=== Recurring characters ===
- Lars Rodríguez (voiced by Lombardo Boyar): Lars is Twister's delinquent teenage brother who frequently harasses the gang from time to time, bullies Twister a lot on a regular basis and generally spends his free time being up to no good. He is also an extremely competitive athlete and is Otto's biggest competitive and social rival. Even though he makes Twister's life very miserable, Lars has shown that he really does care about him deep down and would never want anything bad to happen to him. Lars is often accompanied by his three goons: Pi Piston, Sputz Ringley and Animal.
- Pi Piston (voiced by Jason Spisak), Sputz Ringley (voiced by Dominic Armato and Jason Spisak) and Animal (voiced by Sam Saletta and John Kassir): Pi Piston, Sputz Ringley and Animal are Lars' friends and loyal henchmen. Pi is often the voice of reason of the group, while Sputz is known for having a speech impediment and speaking in an incomprehensible language. Animal does not officially join the group until the second season and is usually silent.
- Eddie Valentine (voiced by Jordan Blake Warkol): The imaginative and self-proclaimed "Prince of the Netherworld" is an occasional participant in the gang's activities and a frequent target of Lars' bullying.
- Oliver Van Rossum (voiced by David Gallagher): A highly intelligent kid who has no experience in sports until he meets Sam. He became a close friend to the gang along with Eddie.
- Officer Shirley (voiced by CCH Pounder in season 1 and Denise Dowse in seasons 2–4): A seldom-seen police officer who does what she can in order to try to keep the peace. Not so much the long arm of the law but rather the harsh word of the law as Officer Shirley keeps the kids of Ocean Shores in line with equal amounts of tough talk and niceness. She enjoys a slightly flirtatious friendship with Raymundo to whom she often refers to as "Big Ray."
- Trish and Sherry (both voiced by Lauren Tom): Trish and Sherry are Reggie's female friends and members of the California All-State Girls' Beach Volleyball Team. They occasionally appear to join in on the gang's activities and have played important roles in several episodes.
- Mackenzie Benders (voiced by Rosslynn Taylor-Jordan): A tough-as-nails five-year-old girl.
- Conroy Blanc (voiced by Obba Babatundé): The park manager of the Madtown Skate Park.
- Merv and Violet Stimpleton (voiced by Henry Gibson and Edie McClurg): The Rockets' next-door neighbors.
- Lieutenant Tice Ryan (voiced by Dale Dye): An Ocean Shores lifeguard who also works as an emergency services coordinator. Lieutenant Tice is skilled at his job and can often be seen with a megaphone barking orders. While he is shown to be nice and fair, Tice takes his job very seriously.
- Keoni Makani (voiced by Matthew Stephen Liu): Tito's young nephew who occasionally visits Ocean Shores from the Hawaiian Islands to spend time with his uncle. Keoni first arrives in Ocean Shores to visit Tito where Otto is originally jealous of him, but Keoni eventually becomes good friends with Otto and the gang. He is a straight-A school student and is shown to be a capable athlete.
- Clio Rodríguez (voiced by Jamie Maria Cronin): Twister's older cousin who is about Reggie's age. Clio is the exact opposite of Reggie in the sense that she is much more "girly." Because she openly imposed on Reggie with her beliefs on how girls should act, Reggie goes on the defense. In the first episode where they interact, Clio and Reggie challenge each other to switch their respective competitions and by the end, the girls realize they are not so different from each other and form a strong friendship after Clio proved herself to be surprisingly good at ice hockey and Reggie proved herself to be surprisingly good at figure skating.
- Raoul and Sandy Rodríguez (voiced by Carlos Alazraqui and Dyana Ortelli): Twister and Lars' parents and the uncle and aunt of Clio and Scotty.
- Paula Dullard (voiced by Jennifer Hale): Sam's mother and the ex-wife of Sam's father, Doug Dullard.
- Trent (voiced by Greg Coolidge): A brand-new resident who moved into Ocean Shores from Gisborne, New Zealand. Trent is a handsome new student in Reggie and Sam's class where Reggie along with Trish, Sherry and all of the other girls in their classroom quickly grow a crush on him. He is shown to be a talented surfer and after Trent and Reggie spend time getting to know each other, it is revealed that Trent has also grown a crush on Reggie.
- Bree "Breezy" Copeley (voiced by Jane Krakowski): A traveling journalist who works as a sales representative of the Sunset Surf sporting goods company. Breezy first arrives in Ocean Shores to conduct business with the shop below the Shore Shack where Raymundo immediately becomes infatuated with her and it is implied that there would have been a relationship if she wasn't constantly traveling.
- Danielle (voiced by Shayna Fox): Danielle is Otto and Reggie's deceased mother and Raymundo's first wife when she was alive.
- Noelani Makani (voiced by Kim Mai Guest): Noelani is Tito's cousin from Oahu, Hawaii and an old friend of Raymundo who later became Otto and Reggie's stepmother and Raymundo's second wife in the final episode of the series.

== Production ==
Rocket Power was produced by Klasky Csupo and Nickelodeon Animation Studio. Producers on the series include Susan Ward, Pernelle Hayes, Victor Wilson, John Crane, Maureen Iser and Erin Ehlich. Gábor Csupó, Arlene Klasky and Eryk Casemiro served as executive producers.

== Episodes ==
Season	Segments	Episodes	Originally released	
Season	Segments	Episodes	First released	Last released
Pilot			Unaired	
1	40	20	August 16, 1999	March 21, 2000
2	40	20	March 28, 2000	March 22, 2004
3	40	20	September 10, 2001	March 25, 2004
4	12	11	July 19, 2003	July 30, 2004

== Home media ==
A VHS tape titled Maxing Out was released by Nickelodeon and Paramount Home Entertainment on August 7, 2001. It was sold exclusively at Toys 'R' Us and contained five episodes. On July 27, 2004, Nickelodeon and Paramount Home Entertainment also released the feature-length episode Island of the Menehune on VHS and DVD with the DVD including three bonus episodes. Other episodes were featured on multiple Nickelodeon compilation VHS tapes and DVDs such as Nickelodeon Super Toons, Nicktoons Christmas, Nicktoons Halloween and Nickstravaganza! 2.

Nickelodeon and Amazon.com teamed up to release Rocket Power and other Nick shows on manufacture-on-demand DVD-R discs available exclusively through Amazon.com's CreateSpace arm. The Rocket Power manufacture-on-demand DVD-R discs have since been discontinued.

Rocket Power home media releases
Season	Title	Format	Release dates		
Season	Title	Format	Region 1	Region 2	Region 4
1	Maxing Out	VHS	August 7, 2001	—N/a	—N/a
1	Nickelodeon Super Toons	VHS	March 12, 2002	—N/a	—N/a
1	Nickstravaganza!	VHS	March 4, 2003	—N/a	—N/a
1	The Complete First Season	DVD	May 21, 2014	—N/a	—N/a
1	Nicktoons: The Show Must Go On!	DVD	September 27, 2004	—N/a	—N/a
1	The Best of Nickelodeon: Summer Adventures	DVD	June 5, 2006	—N/a	—N/a
2	Maxing Out	VHS	August 7, 2001	—N/a	—N/a
2	Nicktoons Halloween	DVD	August 26, 2003	—N/a	—N/a
2	Nickstravaganza! 2	DVD	September 2, 2003	—N/a	—N/a
2	Island of the Menehune	DVD	July 27, 2004	—N/a	—N/a
2	The Complete Second Season	DVD	June 12, 2014	—N/a	—N/a
2	Nicktoons: Job Well Done	VHS	2002	—N/a	—N/a
2	Nicktoons: Sport-a-Rama	VHS		—N/a	—N/a
2	Nicktoons: Laugh-a-Lot	VHS	2003	—N/a	—N/a
2	Nicktoons: The Show Must Go On!	DVD	—N/a	2004	—N/a
2	Nicktoons Halloween: Spooky Stories	DVD	—N/a	—N/a	October 17, 2005
2	Nicktoons: Job Well Done	VHS	2002	—N/a	—N/a
2	Nicktoons: Sport-a-Rama	VHS		—N/a	—N/a
2	Nicktoons: Laugh-a-Lot	VHS	2003	—N/a	—N/a
3	The Complete Third Season	DVD	October 1, 2014	—N/a	—N/a
4	Nicktoons Christmas: Tales of Good Tidings	DVD	September 30, 2003	—N/a	—N/a
4	Island of the Menehune	DVD	July 27, 2004	—N/a	—N/a
4	The Complete Fourth Season	DVD	June 20, 2014	—N/a	—N/a

== Broadcast ==
Rocket Power premiered on Nickelodeon on August 16, 1999 and its final episode (a television movie called "The Big Day") aired on July 30, 2004. Reruns aired on the channel until October 7, 2011.

Nicktoons aired the series from 2002 to 2010. Nick GAS also aired the series from 2003 to 2005. The series reran on TeenNick's former block NickRewind (formerly The '90s Are All That, The Splat and NickSplat) from 2014 to 2017.

== Other projects ==
Other projects related to Rocket Power and developed under the aegis of Klasky-Csupo and/or Nickelodeon have included Rocket Power: Beach Bandits, and Maximum Rocket Power Live: The Battle for Madtown Park, a live-action extreme-sports dramatic arena play that briefly toured the U.S. Midwest in the spring of 2002 before being canceled over low ticket sales (it had originally been scheduled to tour about 40 cities across the U.S. all the way into fall).

In 2002, Nickelodeon also aired the Maximum Rocket Power Games, an extreme-sports competition inspired by the series which pits three teams consisting of professional athletes competing alongside aspiring youth athletes in a series of events. The special was co-hosted by professional skateboarder Andy Macdonald.

== Video games ==
Several video games based on the series were released on the PlayStation, PlayStation 2, GameCube, Game Boy Color, Game Boy Advance and PC throughout the years, including Rocket Power Gettin' Air (2001), Rocket Power: Team Rocket Rescue (2001), Rocket Power: Extreme Arcade Games (2001), Rocket Power: Dream Scheme (2001), Rocket Power: Beach Bandits (2002) and Rocket Power: Zero Gravity Zone (2003).

== Soundtrack ==
Rocket Power Soundtrack

Soundtrack album by various bands
- Released: February 5, 2002
- Recorded: 1999–2002
- Genres: Ska; Punk Rock; Electronic Rock
- Labels: Nick Records; Jive Records; Zomba Recording Corporation

The soundtrack album to Rocket Power was released on February 5, 2002. It is officially the soundtrack to the television film Rocket Power: Race Across New Zealand.

Track listing

1. "Rocket Power Theme Song" by The Wipeouters
2. "Individuality" by Area-7
3. "99 Red Balloons" by Goldfinger
4. "Valentino" by Bowling for Soup
5. "I'm Cool" by Reel Big Fish

== Reception ==
Common Sense Media give the series a three out of five stars, writing "Parents need to know that watching this show just might inspire future X-games participation. The kids – never without a skateboard, bike, hockey stick, or surfboard – perform incredible stunts, seemingly without risk of injury. A boy with less sports ability than the others shows kids that it's OK to need a lot of practice and only take the risks you're personally comfortable with."
