= Aloha, Scooby-Doo! =

Aloha Scooby-Doo!
- UK DVD cover
- Directed by: Tim Maltby
- Written by: Temple Mathews
- Based on: Scooby-Doo by Joe Ruby and Ken Spears
- Produced by: Margaret M. Dean; Tim Maltby
- Starring: Frank Welker; Casey Kasem; Mindy Cohn; Grey DeLisle; Ray Bumatai; Tia Carrere; Teri Garr; Mario Lopez; Adam West
- Edited by: Julie Ann Lau
- Music by: Thomas Chase Jones
- Production companies: Warner Bros. Animation; Warner Bros. Family Entertainment
- Distributed by: Warner Home Video
- Release date: February 8, 2005
- Running time: 74 minutes
- Country: United States
- Language: English

Aloha Scooby-Doo! (stylized as Alōha Scooby-Doo!) is a 2005 American animated adventure film, and the eighth in a series of direct-to-video animated films based on the Scooby-Doo Saturday morning cartoons. It was produced in 2004 by Warner Bros. Animation and released on February 8, 2005, by Warner Bros. Family Entertainment. The film aired on Cartoon Network on May 13, 2005.

It is also Ray Bumatai's last performance before his death in October 2005. This film and Scooby-Doo and the Cyber Chase were the first Scooby-Doo films to be re-released on Blu-ray, on April 5, 2011.

== Plot ==
Mystery Inc. receive a free trip to Hawaii from a surf-and-beachwear company called "Goha Aloha", who wants Daphne Blake to design new swimwear for them. Upon their arrival, the gang meet with Jared Moon, a representative of Goha Aloha and learn of the Big Kahuna of Hanahuna surfing contest, which was originally exclusive to native islanders before the mayor opened it to mainlanders over several islanders' protests, such as local surfer Manu Tuiama and his best friend, Little Jim. The former is especially upset over this because he claims that the ancient Wiki-Tiki spirit sent demons to attack his village and kidnap his girlfriend Snookie in retaliation for the mayor's actions and because local real estate agent Ruben Laluna built a residential complex on sacred ground.

While investigating the attacks, the gang and Manu visit Auntie Mahina, a local shaman who lives deep in the jungle, but Manu is seemingly kidnapped by the Wiki-Tiki along the way. Mahina tells the gang that the Wiki-Tiki is angry because the surfing contest is a Hawaiian ritual and that the winner must be of Hawaiian descent before telling them to head to a nearby volcano or else Manu and Snookie will be sacrificed to the monster. Before they leave, Mahina gives Fred Jones a necklace containing bola gawana root extract, which she says will ward off the Wiki-Tiki. Eventually reaching the volcano, the gang find Snookie, but she is recaptured by the Wiki-Tiki, who proves immune to the necklace.

After making their escape, the gang discover the Wiki-Tiki's demons are remote-controlled robots and a picture of the Wiki-Tiki itself using a Goha Aloha brand surfboard. The next day, Daphne enters the surfing contest to lure out the monster. With Shaggy Rogers and Scooby-Doo's help, she eventually defeats it, allowing the others to unmask it as Manu, who they reveal worked with Snookie to scare off locals and tourists so they can buy their homes and sell them back at higher prices. Additionally, Snookie is a rocket science and robotics expert who created and operated the robots to further their scheme. As the criminals are arrested, Scooby is named the new Big Kahuna of Hanahuna for his work in stopping Manu before the gang celebrate at a luau.

== Voice cast ==
- Frank Welker as Fred Jones, Scooby-Doo, Wiki-Tiki
- Casey Kasem as Shaggy Rogers
- Grey DeLisle as Daphne Blake, Auntie Mahina, Local Woman #2
- Mindy Cohn as Velma Dinkley
- Mario Lopez as Manu Tuiama
- Jeff Lam as The Hawaiian Narrator (uncredited)
- Teri Garr as Mayor Molly Quinn
- Adam West as Jared Moon
- Ray Bumatai as Little Jim
- Tom Kenny as Ruben Laluna
- Dee Bradley Baker as Additional Voices
- Tia Carrere as Snookie

== Reception ==
Variety ranked it 10th of "The 10 Best ‘Scooby-Doo’ Films".
