= Frank De Lima =

American comedian

- Born: Frank Wilcox Napuakekaulike De Lima, Jr. July 8, 1949 (age 75); Pauoa Valley, Honolulu, Oahu, Hawai'i, U.S
- Education: Chaminade University of Honolulu (BA); Saint Patrick's Seminary and University (MDiv)

Comedy career
- Years active: 1975- present
- Website: https://www.frankdelima.com

Franklin Wilcox Napuakekaulike De Lima (born July 8, 1949) is an American comedian and singer from the island of Oahu, Hawai’i. He is best known for his stand-up and song parodies about the politics and culture of Hawai'i, having multiple comedy specials and media appearances.

== Early life and education ==
De Lima was born and raised in Pauoa Valley, Honolulu, in the island of Oahu, within a large Catholic Portuguese and multiracial family and started comedy while he was young. After graduating from Damien Memorial School, De Lima earned a Bachelor of Arts degree in sociology from Chaminade University, both in Honolulu, and a Masters of Divinity from St. Patrick's Seminary and University in Menlo Park, California. After graduating from St. Patrick's, he was ordained as a deacon in the Roman Catholic Church at the age of 25 before deciding to return home to start his career as a singer.

== Career ==
De Lima is one of Hawai'i's most popular comedians, often incorporating current events and trends into music parodies as well as commenting on local ethnic culture.

De Lima, along with his musical duo David Kauahikaua and Bobby Nishida, often perform at nightclubs and concert events throughout Hawai'i and the West Coast. Thus far, De Lima's catalog includes 3 videos and 17 comedy albums. He has also worked with other local comedians, most notably Andy Bumatai and Augie T. During his career, he has received 12 Nā Hōkū Hanohano Awards.

One of his best known appearances is in a commercial for TheCab, in which he performs the contact number for the company. He has also appeared in a number of comedy specials and news appearances as a media personality.

=== Non-profit and charity work ===
In 1980, De Lima founded the non-profit Frank De Lima Student Enrichment Program after he had recovered from a car accident and used his free time to visit schools to help Hawai'i's students understand the importance of reading, studying, laughing, family, managing major emotional and physical life transitions, and providing support to middle and intermediate school students. Since the program's inception, De Lima's visits have increased to 300 schools statewide biennially. In recognition of his commitment to Hawai'i's children, De Lima has been honored by Governor Ben Cayetano Kilohana Award for Volunteer of the Year and the Ellison S. Onizuka Memorial Award from the National Education Association among others.

At 50 years old, De Lima was diagnosed with type 2 diabetes and has since advocated for its prevention through healthy lifestyles. On February 11, 2006, De Lima participated as a guest speaker for the Taking Control of Your Diabetes Conference and joined with the Hawai’i Department of Health as a spokesperson for the Prevent Diabetes Hawai'i campaign in March 2017. During the COVID-19 pandemic, De Lima worked again with the Department of Health to promote public awareness through songs and advertisements about COVID safety.

== Discography ==
- A Taste of Malasadas – originally released in 1977 (Hula Records)
- Portuguese Washerwoman – 1979
- Delightful, Delirious, De Lima – 1980
- Don’t Sneeze When You Eat Saimin – 1981 (1)
- Please Buy This Album – 1982 (1)
- Local Anesthesia – 1986 (1)
- Da Year of da Moke – 1987 (1)
- The Best of De Lima – 1988 (2)
- Supa-Shaka – 1989 (1)
- The Best of De Lima TOO – 1991 (1)
- De Lima’s Jurassic Classics – 1993
- Live at the Polynesian Palace – 1994
- Babooze – 1995 (1)
- Mary Tunta – 1996 (1)
- Ethnicology 101 – 1997
- Live at the Captain’s Table – 1999 (1)
- Frank De Lima’s Silva Anniversary – 25 Years of Comedy - 2002
- Hawaii, I Love It – 2007 (1)
- De Lima’s De Clips - 2014
- (1) Na Hoku Award Winner – Comedy Album of the Year
- (2) Na Hoku Award Winner – Anthology Award
- Other Na Hoku Awards:
- Na Hoku Moe Keale “Aloha Is” Award Winner – Frank De Lima 2003
- Na Hoku Best Song of the Year Award Winner – Waimea Lullaby (Composer: Patrick Downes – Artist Frank De Lima – 1980
