= Can't Be Heaven =

Can't Be Heaven (aka Forever Together)
- poster as Forever Together
- Directed by: Richard Friedman
- Written by: Dario Fagnani
- Produced by: Cal Naylor; Charles O'Brien
- Starring: Bryan Burke; Rachel Ticotin; Michelle Trachtenberg; Ralph Macchio
- Cinematography: Mark Woods
- Edited by: Jimmy B. Frazier
- Music by: Greg Barton
- Production company: Charles O'Brien Productions
- Distributed by: Ardustry Home Entertainment
- Release date: December 5, 1999 (United States)
- Running time: 94 minutes
- Country: United States
- Language: English
- Budget: $2,000,000 (estimated)
- Box office: $7,000,000 (Worldwide)

Can't Be Heaven (also known as Forever Together) is a 1999 American comedy-drama film directed by Richard Friedman. The film stars Ralph Macchio, Bryan Burke, Michelle Trachtenberg, Rachel Ticotin and Diane Ladd. The film was loosely based on the 1968 movie Blackbeard's Ghost.

== Plot ==
Danny Parilla is a young student in middle school. He starts to develop feelings for his best friend Julie Ziff. However a new student by the name of Archie Larocca comes in and sweeps Julie off her feet. Danny flees to the graveyard where his father is buried and talks to him about his problems. He soon comes across the ghost of Hubbie Darling, who helps Danny with his girl problems. As a former living person from the 1930s, Hubbie gives Danny his advice. The advice repeatedly backfires, always leaving Danny depressed. Danny soon learns that Hubbie once had a former lover before dying in an accident. Danny and Julie end up together at a school dance and Hubbie re-connects with his former love, Danny's Nona Gina, with the help of Danny.

== Cast ==
- Bryan Burke as Danny Parilla
- Ralph Macchio as Hubbie Darling
- Diane Ladd as Nona Gina Parilla
  - Siri Baruc as Young Gina Parilla
- Rachel Ticotin as Maggie Parilla
- Michelle Trachtenberg as Julie Ziff
- Garry Marshall as Pawn Shop Owner
- Kaley Cuoco as Teresa Powers
- Michael Galeota as Archie Larocca
- Matt McCoy as Mike
- Rachel Robinson as Miss Viola
- Shayna Fox as Shirley
- Mike Alaimo as Father Micelli
- Ralph Manza as Anzio
- Annie Abbott as Miss Wisser
- Bryan Robinson as Edgar
- Jamie Williams as Phil

== Releases ==
The film was first released in 1999 on DVD by Ardustry Home Entertainment and re-released in 2009 by Mill Creek Entertainment.

== Reception ==
TV Guide praised the film as an imaginative and refreshing look at adolescent romance, writing that it was "an amusing coming of age story far above the run-of-the-mill teen fare churned out in abundance".
