= José Menor =

Spanish footballer

Personal information
- Full name: José Menor Molinero
- Date of birth: 20 August 2002 (age 24)
- Place of birth: Burgos, Spain
- Position: Forward

Team information
- Current team: Calahorra

Youth career
- Briviesca
- 2019–2020: Burgos Promesas 2000
- 2020–2022: Burgos

Senior career*
Years	Team	Apps	(Gls)
2022	Racing Lermeño	12	(4)
2022–2023	Briviesca	25	(12)
2023–2025	Burgos B	58	(12)
2024	Burgos	1	(0)
2025–	Calahorra	10	(1)
- * Club domestic league appearances and goals as of 9 November 2025

José Menor Molinero (born 20 August 2002) is a Spanish footballer who plays as a forward for Tercera Federación club Calahorra.

== Career ==
Born in Burgos, Castile and León, Menor played for CF Briviesca, CD Burgos Promesas 2000 and Burgos CF as a youth. On 14 January 2022, he joined Primera Regional side Racing Lermeño, and made his senior debut during the remainder of the season.

On 1 August 2022, Menor returned to Briviesca, now being assigned to the first team also in the sixth division. Exactly one year later, after scoring 12 goals for the side, he returned to Burgos and was assigned to the reserves in Tercera Federación.

Menor made his first team debut with the Blanquinegros on 24 March 2024, coming on as a late substitute for Miki Muñoz in a 3–0 Segunda División away loss to SD Huesca.
