= Benjamin Menor =

American judge (1922–1986)

Benjamin Menor (September 27, 1922 – July 4, 1986) was a justice of the Supreme Court of Hawaii from April 16, 1974, to December 30, 1981.

== Biography ==
Born in the Philippines, Menor came to Hawaii with his family at age 8 and attended the local schools, graduating from Hilo High School in 1941 and attending Honolulu Business College. He obtained U.S. citizenship and served in the United States Army during World War II, from 1944 to 1946, fighting in the Philippines. After the war, he received a Bachelor of Arts from the University of Hawaiʻi in 1950, followed by a Juris Doctor from the Boston University School of Law in 1952. Menor held various private and public positions before being nominated to the state supreme court, including a term as a member of the Hawaii State Senate from 1962 to 1966. Menor was the first person of Filipino ancestry to be elevated to a state supreme court in the United States. Menor's predecessor, Masaji Marumoto, resigned from the court in December 1973 to enable Governor John A. Burns to appoint his successor, with Burns then appointing Menor to the seat.

== Personal life and death ==
Menor's brother is Barney B. Menor, a former member of the Hawaii House of Representatives. Menor married Angie Iranon of Honolulu, with whom he had three sons including longtime legislator Ron Menor. He died in Honolulu at the age of 63, after developing throat cancer. He is interred at the National Memorial Cemetery of the Pacific.

Political offices
Preceded by Masaji Marumoto	Justice of the Supreme Court of Hawaii; 1974–1981	Succeeded by Frank D. Padgett
