= Rap Reiplinger =

American comedian

James Kawika Piʻimauna "Rap" Reiplinger (July 16, 1950 – January 19, 1984) was a Hawaiian comedian, whose humor is an integral part of Hawaii today.

== Biography ==
After attending Punahou School, Reiplinger began performing professionally. In 1974 he helped create the comedy ensemble Booga Booga with James Grant Benton and Ed Kaʻahea. In 1982, he received an Emmy Award and bronze medal from the International Film and Television Festival of New York for the "Most Outstanding Television Production" for his television special, Rap′s Hawaii, which he wrote and in which he starred.

Reiplinger's writing, performance, and comic genius was part of the second Hawaiian Renaissance of the 1970s and 1980s.

Reiplinger was married to television journalist Leesa Clark Stone from October 25, 1983 until his death on January 19, 1984. Reiplinger died in 1984 from cocaine-related causes at the age of 33 after going missing for a week.

== Television ==
- Hawaii Five-O (1977) as Stu Hinman
- Rap's Hawai'i KGMB (1982)

== Discography ==
- Poi Dog (1978)
- Crab Dreams (1979) (Won a Nā Hōkū Hanohano award for Best Comedy Album in 1979.)
- Do I Dare Disturb the Universe (1979)
- Strange Bird (1981)
- Rap′s Hawaii (TV Special) 1982 Emmy Award (DVD 2003)
- Towed Away (1983) (Won a Nā Hōkū Hanohano award for Best Graphics in 1984.)
- Rap′s Aloha (TV Special) 1984 Broadcast posthumously.
- Poi Dog With Crabs (1992) (Poi Dog and Crab Dreams) Released posthumously.
- The Best of Rap (1993) Released posthumously.
- The Best of Rap, Too (1996) Released posthumously.
