= Barney B. Menor =

American politician

Member of the Hawaii House of Representatives
- In office 1965–1970

Personal details
- Born: June 4, 1931 Pahoa, Hawaii, U.S.
- Died: November 14, 1999 (aged 68)
- Party: Democratic
- Relatives: Benjamin Menor (brother)
- Education: University of Hawaiʻi at Mānoa

Barney Bonifacio Menor (June 4, 1931 – November 14, 1999) was an American politician. He served as a Democratic member of the Hawaii House of Representatives.

== Life and career ==
Menor was born in Pahoa, Hawaii. He graduated from University of Hawaiʻi at Mānoa in 1953 and participated in the Army Reserve Officers' Training Corps. He then served in the United States Army from 1953 to 1955. While in the army, he was in the legal department of the 20th Infantry Regiment and became a first lieutenant. Menor served in the Hawaii House of Representatives from 1965 to 1970.

He was a real estate broker for 40 years and a land manager for Puna Geothermal Venture. He also served president of the Filipino Chamber of Commerce of Hawaii.

Menor died on November 14, 1999, at the age of 68. He is buried at the National Memorial Cemetery of the Pacific.
