= Rocket Power: Beach Bandits =

2002 video game

- North American GameCube cover art
- Developers: Evolution Games (Note: Additional work by Halfbrick Studios); Helixe (GBA)
- Publisher: THQ
- Producer: Justin Green
- Designer: Shane Collier
- Programmer: Sean Hammond
- Artist: Sean Eustace
- Platforms: GameCube; PlayStation 2; Game Boy Advance
- Release: GameCube, PlayStation 2; NA: September 24, 2002; EU: October 25, 2002; Game Boy Advance; NA: November 18, 2002
- Genres: Action, sports
- Modes: Single-player, multiplayer

Rocket Power: Beach Bandits is an extreme sports game based on the Nickelodeon animated television series Rocket Power. It was developed by Evolution Games and published by THQ. It was released for GameCube and PlayStation 2 in North America on September 24, 2002, and in Europe on October 25, 2002. Developed by Helixe, a separate version of the game was released for Game Boy Advance on November 18, 2002.

The game received "mixed or average" reviews upon its release according to review aggregation website Metacritic.

== Plot ==
The game begins with the characters of Rocket Power about to start their summer vacation. Suddenly, the characters realize the sand in Ocean Shores has been taken away by a mysterious criminal. After investigation, they find out a company called Golem Industries has stolen all of the sand and decide to stop them.

The characters go to the lakes and find out that the water there has also been stolen by Golem Industries. They find out that the water is used to ship electricity to a secret base. They destroy the water plants, and after a confrontation with the "Barramundi Bot", return to Ocean Shores.

They eventually arrive at "Wishing Waters", the location of the secret base, which is revealed to be a giant robot factory underneath a water park controlled by a sentient supercomputer. Sam, one of the characters, hacks into the computer's program in order to build a robot that can gain access to robot-only areas. After exploring most of the base, they come into contact with "Cyrax", the supercomputer controlling the factory, which destroys their robot. After Team Rocket Power destroys all of Cyrax's computer chips with skateboards, Cyrax promptly explodes, and they escape. After coming back to Ocean Shores for a second time, the characters challenge Lars to a downhill dirt track race. After winning the dirt track race, they manage to convince Lars to give them the secret location of Golem Industries' headquarters.

Once they make it inside the base, they find a massive earthquake machine that Golem Sr, the Golem Industries owner, controls. Golem turns the machine on, the base rumbles, and a pipe knocks into him, sending him into a pool of lava. Golem then comes out of the lava and is revealed to be a robot. The characters confront Golem and destroy him.

After the gang returns to Ocean Shores for a final time, they find out that the mastermind behind the entire plan is Eric Golem Jr., the alleged son of Golem Sr.. He threatens to destroy all of Ocean Shores with a giant tsunami machine. In order to stop the impending destruction, they challenge Eric to a final set of race challenges. After the third battle, however, Eric quits the challenges and runs to the control room, prompting Otto, another character, to race him on hoverboards to get to the control room before he does. After Otto's win, the base is destroyed. During the final scene, everyone forgives Eric Golem Jr., for everything that he has done and encourages him to make human friends.

== Reception ==
Reception

Aggregate scores
Aggregator	Score		
Aggregator	GBA	GameCube	PS2
GameRankings	N/A	61%	N/A
Metacritic	N/A	53/100	N/A

Review scores
Publication	Score		
Publication	GBA	GameCube	PS2
GamesMaster	N/A	N/A	25%
GameZone	N/A	6.7/10	8/10
IGN	N/A	5/10	N/A
Nintendo Power	N/A	2.8/5	N/A
Nintendo World Report	N/A	4.5/10	N/A
PlayStation Official Magazine – UK	N/A	N/A	3/10
X-Play	N/A	3/5	N/A

The game received "mixed or average" reviews from critics according to the review aggregation website Metacritic.

Greg Bemis of Extended Play gave the game three stars out of five, saying, "For the younger set, especially those enamored by "Rocket Power," this title provides a solid and enjoyable experience. For those who just want some good old gameplay, "Rocket Power: Beach Bandits" has that too." IGN gave the GameCube version a 5 out of 10, writing, "It's for kids. Does that mean it has to be mediocre?"
